This is a list of Lords Commissioners of the Admiralty (incomplete before the Restoration, 1660).

The Lords Commissioners of the Admiralty were the members of The Board of Admiralty, which exercised the office of Lord High Admiral when it was not vested in a single person. The commissioners were a mixture of politicians without naval experience and professional naval officers, the proportion of naval officers generally increasing over time. In 1940, the Secretary of the Admiralty, a civil servant, became a member of the Board. The Lord High Admiral, and thus the Board of Admiralty, ceased to have operational command of the Royal Navy when the three service ministries were merged into the Ministry of Defence in 1964, when the office of Lord High Admiral reverted to the Crown.

1628 to 1641

20 September 1628: Commission.
Richard Weston, 1st Baron Weston (Lord High Treasurer), First Lord
Robert Bertie, 1st Earl of Lindsey (Lord Great Chamberlain)
Edward Sackville, 4th Earl of Dorset (Lord Chamberlain to the Queen)
Francis Cottington, 1st Baron Cottington (Chancellor of the Exchequer)
Sir Henry Vane (Comptroller of the Household)
Sir John Coke (Secretary of State)
Sir Francis Windebank (Secretary of State)
10 April 1635: Commission.
Robert Bertie, 1st Earl of Lindsey (Lord Great Chamberlain), First Lord
others
16 March 1636: Commission
William Juxon (Lord High Treasurer), First Lord
others
13 April 1638: Algernon Percy, 10th Earl of Northumberland, Lord High Admiral

1641 to 1661

From the appointment of Warwick until 1660, appointments during this period were made by Parliament or a part thereof.
7 December 1643: Robert Rich, 2nd Earl of Warwick, Lord High Admiral
15 April 1645: Commission (by the Committee of Both Houses).
Robert Devereux, 3rd Earl of Essex
Robert Rich, 2nd Earl of Warwick
William Fiennes, 1st Viscount Saye and Sele
Dudley North, 3rd Baron North
William Earle
Philip Stapleton
John Evelyn, Jr.
Christopher Wray, MP
John Rolle
Giles Grene
D. Hollis
John Selden, MP
F. Rouse
Thomas Eden, MP
T. Lisle
Bulstrode Whitelocke, MP
28 April 1645: Commission (by the House of Commons)
Robert Rich, 2nd Earl of Warwick
Alexander Bence
Squire Bence
H. Pelham
12 February 1649: Commission (by the House of Commons)
_ Dean
Francis Popham
Colonel Robert Blake
23 February 1649: Powers transferred to the Council of State
3 December 1653:
General Robert Blake
General George Monck
Major-General John Desborow
Vice-Admiral William Penn
Colonel Philip Jones
Colonel John Clerk
John Stone
Major William Burton
Vincent Gooking
Lieutenant-Colonel Kelsey
November 1655: During the Protectorate (CSPD, IX, 10)
John Lambert
William Sydenham
John Desborough
Philipp Jones
Thomas Kelsey
Edward Salmon
Edward Montague
General George Monck
General Robert Blake
John Clerke
Governor Edward Hopkins

1661 to 1681

29 January 1661: The Duke of York and Albany, Lord High Admiral
9 July 1673: Commission.
Prince Rupert
The Earl of Shaftesbury (ex officio as Lord Chancellor)
The Viscount Osborne (ex officio as Lord High Treasurer)
The Earl of Anglesey (ex officio as Lord Privy Seal)
The Duke of Buckingham
The Duke of Monmouth
The Duke of Lauderdale
The Duke of Ormonde
The Earl of Arlington (ex officio as Secretary of State for the Southern Department)
Sir George Carteret, Bt (ex officio as Vice-Chamberlain of the Household)
The Hon. Henry Coventry (ex officio as Secretary of State for the Northern Department)
Edward Seymour (ex officio as Treasurer of the Navy)
31 October 1674: Commission.
Prince Rupert
The Lord Finch (ex officio as Lord Keeper)
The Earl of Danby (ex officio as Lord High Treasurer)
The Earl of Anglesey (ex officio as Lord Privy Seal)
The Duke of Buckingham
The Duke of Monmouth
The Duke of Lauderdale
The Duke of Ormonde
The Earl of Arlington
Sir George Carteret, Bt (ex officio as Vice-Chamberlain of the Household)
The Hon. Henry Coventry (ex officio as Secretary of State for the Southern Department)
Sir Joseph Williamson (ex officio as Secretary of State for the Northern Department)
Edward Seymour (ex officio as Treasurer of the Navy)
26 September 1677: Commission.
Prince Rupert
The Lord Finch (ex officio as Lord Chancellor)
The Earl of Danby (ex officio as Lord High Treasurer)
The Earl of Anglesey (ex officio as Lord Privy Seal)
The Duke of Monmouth
The Duke of Lauderdale
The Duke of Ormonde
The Earl of Ossory
The Earl of Arlington
Sir George Carteret, Bt (ex officio as Vice-Chamberlain of the Household)
The Hon. Henry Coventry (ex officio as Secretary of State for the Southern Department)
Sir Joseph Williamson (ex officio as Secretary of State for the Northern Department)
Sir John Ernle
Sir Thomas Chicheley
Edward Seymour (ex officio as Treasurer of the Navy)
14 May 1679: Commission.
The Hon. Sir Henry Capell, First Lord
The Hon. Daniel Finch
Sir Thomas Lee, Bt
Sir Humphrey Winch, Bt
Sir Thomas Meres
Edward Vaughan
Edward Hales

1681 to 1701

19 February 1681: Commission.
The Hon. Daniel Finch, First Lord
Sir Humphrey Winch, Bt
Sir Thomas Meres
Edward Hales
The Viscount Brouncker
Sir Thomas Littleton, Bt
20 January 1682: Commission.
Lord Finch, First Lord
Sir Humphrey Winch, Bt
Sir Thomas Meres
Edward Hales
The Viscount Brouncker
Henry Savile
Sir John Chicheley, Naval Lord
22 August 1683: Commission.
The Earl of Nottingham, First Lord
Sir Humphrey Winch, Bt
Sir Thomas Meres
Edward Hales
The Viscount Brouncker
Henry Savile
Sir John Chicheley, Naval Lord
Arthur Herbert, Naval Lord (supernumerary)
17 April 1684: Commission.
The Earl of Nottingham, First Lord
Sir Humphrey Winch, Bt
Sir Thomas Meres
Sir Edward Hales
Henry Savile
Sir John Chicheley, Naval Lord
Arthur Herbert, Naval Lord
Lord Vaughan (supernumerary)
19 May 1684: King Charles II
6 February 1685: King James II
13 February 1689: King William III
8 March 1689: Commission.
Arthur Herbert, First Lord and Senior Naval Lord
The Earl of Carbery
Sir Michael Warton
Sir Thomas Lee, Bt
Sir John Chicheley, Naval Lord
Sir John Lowther, Bt
William Sacheverell
20 January 1690: Commission.
The Earl of Pembroke, First Lord
The Earl of Carbery
Sir Thomas Lee, Bt
Sir John Lowther, Bt
Sir John Chicheley, Senior Naval Lord
5 June 1690: Commission.
The Earl of Pembroke, First Lord
The Earl of Carbery
Sir Thomas Lee, Bt
Sir John Lowther, Bt
Edward Russell, Senior Naval Lord
Sir Richard Onslow, Bt
Henry Priestman, Naval Lord
23 January 1691: Commission.
The Earl of Pembroke, First Lord
Sir Thomas Lee, Bt
Sir John Lowther, Bt
Sir Richard Onslow, Bt
Henry Priestman, Senior Naval Lord
The Viscount Falkland
Robert Austen
16 November 1691: Commission.
The Earl of Pembroke, First Lord
Sir John Lowther, Bt
Sir Richard Onslow, Bt
Henry Priestman, Senior Naval Lord
The Viscount Falkland
Robert Austen
Sir Robert Rich, Bt
10 March 1692: Commission.
The Lord Cornwallis, First Lord
Sir John Lowther, Bt
Sir Richard Onslow, Bt
Henry Priestman, Senior Naval Lord
The Viscount Falkland
Robert Austen
Sir Robert Rich, Bt
15 April 1693: Commission.
The Viscount Falkland, First Lord
Sir John Lowther, Bt
Henry Priestman, Senior Naval Lord
Robert Austen
Sir Robert Rich, Bt
Henry Killigrew, Naval Lord
Sir Ralph Delaval, Naval Lord
2 May 1694: Commission.
Edward Russell, First Lord and Senior Naval Lord
Sir John Lowther, Bt
Henry Priestman, Naval Lord
Robert Austen
Sir Robert Rich, Bt
Sir George Rooke, Naval Lord
Sir John Houblon
24 February 1696: Commission.
Edward Russell, First Lord and Senior Naval Lord
Henry Priestman, Naval Lord
Robert Austen
Sir Robert Rich, Bt
Sir George Rooke, Naval Lord
Sir John Houblon
James Kendall
5 June 1697: Commission.
The Earl of Orford, First Lord and Senior Naval Lord
Henry Priestman, Naval Lord
Sir Robert Rich, Bt
Sir George Rooke, Naval Lord
Sir John Houblon
James Kendall
The Hon. Goodwin Wharton
31 May 1699: Commission.
The Earl of Bridgewater, First Lord
The Lord Haversham
Sir Robert Rich, Bt
Sir George Rooke, Senior Naval Lord
Sir David Mitchell, Naval Lord
28 October 1699: Commission.
The Earl of Bridgewater, First Lord
The Lord Haversham
Sir George Rooke, Senior Naval Lord
Sir David Mitchell, Naval Lord
George Churchill, Naval Lord

1701 to 1721

4 April 1701: Commission.
The Earl of Pembroke, First Lord
The Lord Haversham
Sir George Rooke, Senior Naval Lord
Sir David Mitchell, Naval Lord
George Churchill, Naval Lord
26 January 1702: Earl of Pembroke, Lord High Admiral
20 May 1702: Prince George, Lord High Admiral
Council of the Lord High Admiral, 22 May 1702:
Sir George Rooke Senior Member
Sir David Mitchell
George Churchill
Richard Hill
Council of the Lord High Admiral, 29 March 1703:
Sir George Rooke Senior Member
Sir David Mitchell
George Churchill
Richard Hill
The Hon. James Brydges
Council of the Lord High Admiral, 30 April 1704:
Sir George Rooke Senior Member
Sir David Mitchell
George Churchill
Richard Hill
The Hon. James Brydges
The Hon. Henry Paget
Council of the Lord High Admiral, 26 December 1704:
Sir George Rooke Senior Member
Sir David Mitchell
George Churchill
Richard Hill
The Hon. James Brydges
The Hon. Henry Paget
Sir Cloudesley Shovell
Council of the Lord High Admiral, 11 June 1705:
Sir David Mitchell Senior Member
George Churchill
Richard Hill
The Hon. Henry Paget
Sir Cloudesley Shovell
Robert Walpole
Council of the Lord High Admiral, 8 February 1706:
Sir David Mitchell Senior Member
George Churchill
Richard Hill
The Hon. Henry Paget
Sir Cloudesley Shovell
Robert Walpole
Sir Stafford Fairborne
28 June 1707: Prince George, Lord High Admiral (reappointed as Lord High Admiral of Great Britain following the Union with Scotland)
Council of the Lord High Admiral, 28 June 1707
Sir David Mitchell Senior Member
George Churchill
Richard Hill
The Hon. Henry Paget
Sir Cloudesley Shovell
Robert Walpole
Sir Stafford Fairborne
Council of the Lord High Admiral, 19 April 1708:
Earl of Wemyss Senior Member
George Churchill
Richard Hill
The Hon. Henry Paget
Sir Stafford Fairborne
Sir John Leake
Council of the Lord High Admiral, 20 June 1708:
Earl of Wemyss Senior Member
George Churchill
Richard Hill
The Hon. Henry Paget
Sir John Leake
Sir James Wishart
Robert Fairfax
28 October 1708: Queen Anne, Lord High Admiral
29 November 1708: The Earl of Pembroke, Lord High Admiral, Senior Member
8 November 1709: Commission.
The Earl of Orford, First Lord
Sir John Leake, Senior Naval Lord
Sir George Byng, Naval Lord
George Dodington
Paul Methuen
4 October 1710: Commission.
Sir John Leake, Naval Lord (not called "First Lord")
Sir George Byng, Senior Naval Lord
George Dodington
Paul Methuen
Sir William Drake, Bt
John Aislabie
20 December 1710: Commission.
Sir John Leake, Naval Lord
Sir George Byng, Senior Naval Lord
Sir William Drake, Bt
John Aislabie
Sir James Wishart, Naval Lord
George Clarke
30 September 1712: Commission.
The Earl of Strafford, First Lord
Sir John Leake, Senior Naval Lord
Sir George Byng, Naval Lord
Sir William Drake, Bt
John Aislabie
Sir James Wishart, Naval Lord
George Clarke
19 January 1714: Commission.
The Earl of Strafford, First Lord
Sir John Leake, Senior Naval Lord
Sir William Drake, Bt
John Aislabie
Sir James Wishart, Naval Lord
George Clarke
9 April 1714: Commission.
The Earl of Strafford, First Lord
Sir John Leake, Senior Naval Lord
Sir William Drake, Bt
Sir James Wishart, Naval Lord
George Clarke
Sir George Beaumont, Bt
14 October 1714: Commission.
The Earl of Orford, First Lord
Sir George Byng, Senior Naval Lord
George Dodington
Sir John Jennings, Naval Lord
Sir Charles Turner
Abraham Stanyan
George Baillie
16 April 1717: Commission.
The Earl of Berkeley, First Lord
Matthew Aylmer, Senior Naval Lord
Sir George Byng, Naval Lord
John Cockburn
William Richard Chetwynd
19 March 1718: Commission.
The Earl of Berkeley, First Lord
Sir George Byng, Senior Naval Lord
Sir John Jennings, Naval Lord
John Cockburn
William Richard Chetwynd
Sir John Norris, Naval Lord
Sir Charles Wager, Naval Lord

1721 to 1741

30 September 1721: Commission.
The Earl of Berkeley, First Lord
Sir John Jennings, Senior Naval Lord
John Cockburn
William Richard Chetwynd
Sir John Norris, Naval Lord
Sir Charles Wager, Naval Lord
Daniel Pulteney
3 June 1725: Commission.
The Earl of Berkeley, First Lord
Sir John Jennings, Senior Naval Lord
John Cockburn
William Richard Chetwynd
Sir John Norris, Naval Lord
Sir Charles Wager, Naval Lord
Sir George Oxenden, Bt
1 June 1727: Commission.
The Earl of Berkeley, First Lord
John Cockburn
William Richard Chetwynd
Sir John Norris, Senior Naval Lord
Sir Charles Wager, Naval Lord
Sir George Oxenden, Bt
Sir Thomas Lyttelton, Bt
2 August 1727: Commission.
The Viscount Torrington, First Lord
John Cockburn
Sir John Norris, Senior Naval Lord
Sir Charles Wager, Naval Lord
Sir Thomas Lyttelton, Bt
Viscount Malpas
Samuel Molyneux
1 June 1728: Commission.
The Viscount Torrington, First Lord
John Cockburn
Sir John Norris, Senior Naval Lord
Sir Charles Wager, Naval Lord
Sir Thomas Lyttelton, Bt
Viscount Malpas
Sir William Yonge
19 May 1729: Commission.
The Viscount Torrington, First Lord
John Cockburn
Sir John Norris, Senior Naval Lord
Sir Charles Wager, Naval Lord
Sir Thomas Lyttelton, Bt
Sir William Yonge
Lord Archibald Hamilton, Naval Lord
13 May 1730: Commission.
The Viscount Torrington, First Lord
John Cockburn
Sir Charles Wager, Senior Naval Lord
Sir Thomas Lyttelton, Bt
Lord Archibald Hamilton, Naval Lord
Sir Thomas Frankland, Bt
Thomas Winnington
15 June 1732: Commission.
The Viscount Torrington, First Lord
Sir Charles Wager, Senior Naval Lord
Sir Thomas Lyttelton, Bt
Lord Archibald Hamilton, Naval Lord
Sir Thomas Frankland, Bt
Thomas Winnington
Thomas Clutterbuck
21 June 1733: Commission.
Sir Charles Wager, First Lord
Sir Thomas Lyttelton, Bt
Lord Archibald Hamilton, Senior Naval Lord
Sir Thomas Frankland, Bt
Thomas Winnington
Thomas Clutterbuck
Lord Harry Powlett, Naval Lord
22 May 1736: Commission.
Sir Charles Wager, First Lord
Sir Thomas Lyttelton, Bt
Lord Archibald Hamilton, Senior Naval Lord
Sir Thomas Frankland, Bt
Thomas Clutterbuck
Lord Harry Powlett, Naval Lord
John Campbell
13 March 1738: Commission.
Sir Charles Wager, First Lord
Sir Thomas Lyttelton, Bt
Sir Thomas Frankland, Bt
Thomas Clutterbuck
Lord Harry Powlett, Senior Naval Lord
John Campbell
Lord Vere Beauclerk, Naval Lord

1741 to 1761

5 May 1741: Commission.
Sir Charles Wager, First Lord
Sir Thomas Frankland, Bt
Lord Harry Powlett, Senior Naval Lord
John Campbell
Lord Vere Beauclerk, Naval Lord
Lord Glenorchy
Edward Thompson
19 March 1742: Commission.
The Earl of Winchilsea, First Lord
John Cockburn
Lord Archibald Hamilton, Senior Naval Lord
The Lord Baltimore
Philip Cavendish, Naval Lord
George Lee
John Trevor
13 December 1743: Commission.
The Earl of Winchilsea, First Lord
John Cockburn
Lord Archibald Hamilton, Senior Naval Lord
The Lord Baltimore
George Lee
Sir Charles Hardy, Naval Lord
John Phillipson
27 December 1744: Commission.
The Duke of Bedford, First Lord
The Earl of Sandwich
Lord Archibald Hamilton, Senior Naval Lord
Lord Vere Beauclerk, Naval Lord
The Lord Baltimore
George Anson, Naval Lord
George Grenville
25 April 1745: Commission.
The Duke of Bedford, First Lord
The Earl of Sandwich
Lord Archibald Hamilton, Senior Naval Lord
Lord Vere Beauclerk, Naval Lord
George Anson, Naval Lord
George Grenville
The Hon. Henry Legge
25 February 1746: Commission.
The Duke of Bedford, First Lord
The Earl of Sandwich
Lord Vere Beauclerk, Senior Naval Lord
George Anson, Naval Lord
George Grenville
The Hon. Henry Legge
Viscount Barrington
27 June 1746: Commission.
Duke of Bedford, First Lord
Earl of Sandwich
Lord Vere Beauclerk, Senior Naval Lord
George Anson, Naval Lord
George Grenville
The Viscount Barrington
Viscount Duncannon
23 June 1747: Commission.
The Duke of Bedford, First Lord
The Earl of Sandwich
Lord Vere Beauclerk, Senior Naval Lord
George Anson, Naval Lord
Viscount Barrington
Viscount Duncannon
Welbore Ellis
26 February 1748: Commission.
The Earl of Sandwich, First Lord
Lord Vere Beauclerk, Senior Naval Lord
The Lord Anson, Naval Lord
The Viscount Barrington
Viscount Duncannon
Welbore Ellis
The Hon. John Stanhope
24 December 1748: Commission.
Earl of Sandwich, First Lord
Lord Vere Beauclerk, Senior Naval Lord
The Viscount Barrington
Viscount Duncannon
Welbore Ellis
The Hon. Thomas Villiers
18 November 1749: Commission.
The Earl of Sandwich, First Lord
The Lord Anson, Senior Naval Lord
Viscount Barrington
Viscount Duncannon
Welbore Ellis
The Hon. Thomas Villiers
Viscount Trentham
22 June 1751: Commission.
The Lord Anson, First Lord
The Viscount Barrington
Viscount Duncannon
Welbore Ellis
The Hon. Thomas Villiers
William Rowley, Senior Naval Lord
The Hon. Edward Boscawen, Naval Lord
9 April 1754: Commission.
The Lord Anson, First Lord
Viscount Duncannon
Welbore Ellis
The Hon. Thomas Villiers
Sir William Rowley, Senior Naval Lord
The Hon. Edward Boscawen, Naval Lord
The Hon. Charles Townshend
29 December 1755: Commission.
The Lord Anson, First Lord
Viscount Duncannon
The Hon. Thomas Villiers
Sir William Rowley, Senior Naval Lord
The Hon. Edward Boscawen, Naval Lord
The Viscount Bateman
The Hon. Richard Edgcumbe
17 November 1756: Commission.
The Earl Temple, First Lord
The Hon. Edward Boscawen, Senior Naval Lord
Temple West, Naval Lord
John Pitt
George Hay
Thomas Orby Hunter
Gilbert Elliot
13 December 1756: Commission.
The Earl Temple, First Lord
The Hon. Edward Boscawen, Senior Naval Lord
Temple West, Naval Lord
George Hay
Thomas Orby Hunter
Gilbert Elliot
The Hon. John Forbes, Naval Lord
6 April 1757: Commission.
The Earl of Winchilsea, First Lord
Sir William Rowley, Senior Naval Lord
The Hon. Edward Boscawen, Naval Lord
Gilbert Elliot
The Lord Carysfort
Savage Mostyn, Naval Lord
The Hon. Edwin Sandys
2 July 1757: Commission.
The Lord Anson, First Lord
The Hon. Edward Boscawen, Senior Naval Lord
Temple West, Naval Lord
George Hay
Thomas Orby Hunter
Gilbert Elliot
The Hon. John Forbes, Naval Lord
26 September 1757: Commission.
The Lord Anson, First Lord
The Hon. Edward Boscawen, Senior Naval Lord
George Hay
Thomas Orby Hunter
Gilbert Elliot
The Hon. John Forbes, Naval Lord

1761 to 1782

19 March 1761: Commission.
The Lord Anson, First Lord
George Hay
Thomas Orby Hunter
The Hon. John Forbes, Senior Naval Lord
Hans Stanley
Viscount Villiers
Thomas Pelham
17 June 1762: Commission.
The Earl of Halifax, First Lord
George Hay
Thomas Orby Hunter
The Hon. John Forbes, Senior Naval Lord
Hans Stanley
Viscount Villiers
Thomas Pelham
18 October 1762: Commission.
The Hon. George Grenville, First Lord
George Hay
Thomas Orby Hunter
The Hon. John Forbes, Senior Naval Lord
Hans Stanley
Viscount Villiers
Thomas Pelham
1 January 1763: Commission.
The Hon. George Grenville, First Lord
George Hay
Thomas Orby Hunter
The Hon. John Forbes, Senior Naval Lord
Hans Stanley
The Lord Carysfort
James Harris
20 April 1763: Commission.
The Earl of Sandwich, First Lord
George Hay
Hans Stanley
The Lord Carysfort
The Viscount Howe, Senior Naval Lord
The Lord Digby
Thomas Pitt
16 September 1763: Commission.
The Earl of Egmont, First Lord
George Hay
Hans Stanley
The Lord Carysfort
The Viscount Howe, Senior Naval Lord
The Lord Digby
Thomas Pitt
31 July 1765: Commission.
The Earl of Egmont, First Lord
Thomas Pitt
Sir Charles Saunders, Senior Naval Lord
The Hon. Augustus Keppel, Naval Lord
Charles Townshend
Sir William Meredith, Bt
John Buller
21 December 1765: Commission.
The Earl of Egmont, First Lord
Sir Charles Saunders, Senior Naval Lord
The Hon. Augustus Keppel, Naval Lord
Charles Townshend
Sir William Meredith, Bt
John Buller
The Hon. John Yorke
15 September 1766: Commission.
Sir Charles Saunders, First Lord
The Hon. Augustus Keppel, Senior Naval Lord
Charles Townshend
Sir William Meredith, Bt
John Buller
The Viscount Palmerston
Sir George Yonge, Bt
11 December 1766: Commission.
Sir Edward Hawke, First Lord
Charles Townshend
John Buller
The Viscount Palmerston
Sir George Yonge, Bt
Sir Peircy Brett, Senior Naval Lord
Charles Jenkinson
8 March 1768: Commission.
Sir Edward Hawke, First Lord
Charles Townshend
John Buller
The Viscount Palmerston
Sir George Yonge, Bt
Sir Peircy Brett, Senior Naval Lord
Lord Charles Spencer
28 February 1770: Commission.
Sir Edward Hawke, First Lord
John Buller
The Viscount Palmerston
Lord Charles Spencer
The Viscount Lisburne
Francis Holburne, Senior Naval Lord
The Hon. Charles James Fox
12 January 1771: Commission.
The Earl of Sandwich, First Lord
John Buller
The Viscount Palmerston
Lord Charles Spencer
The Viscount Lisburne
Francis Holburne, Senior Naval Lord
The Hon. Charles James Fox
2 February 1771: Commission.
The Earl of Sandwich, First Lord
John Buller
The Viscount Palmerston
Lord Charles Spencer
The Viscount Lisburne
The Hon. Charles James Fox
The Hon. Augustus John Hervey, First Naval Lord
6 May 1772: Commission.
The Earl of Sandwich, First Lord
John Buller
The Viscount Palmerston
Lord Charles Spencer
The Viscount Lisburne
The Hon. Augustus John Hervey, First Naval Lord
Thomas Bradshaw
30 December 1774: Commission.
The Earl of Sandwich, First Lord
John Buller
The Viscount Palmerston
Lord Charles Spencer
The Viscount Lisburne
The Hon. Augustus John Hervey, First Naval Lord
Henry Penton
12 April 1775: Commission.
The Earl of Sandwich, First Lord
John Buller
The Viscount Palmerston
Lord Charles Spencer
The Viscount Lisburne
Henry Penton
Sir Hugh Palliser, First Naval Lord
15 December 1777: Commission.
The Earl of Sandwich, First Lord
John Buller
Lord Charles Spencer
The Earl of Lisburne
Henry Penton
Sir Hugh Palliser, First Naval Lord
The Lord Mulgrave
23 April 1779: Commission.
The Earl of Sandwich, First Lord
John Buller
Lord Charles Spencer
The Earl of Lisburne
Henry Penton
The Lord Mulgrave
Robert Man, First Naval Lord
16 July 1779: Commission.
The Earl of Sandwich, First Lord
John Buller
The Earl of Lisburne
Henry Penton
The Lord Mulgrave
Robert Man, First Naval Lord
Bamber Gascoyne
22 September 1780: Commission.
The Earl of Sandwich, First Lord
The Earl of Lisburne
Henry Penton
The Lord Mulgrave
Bamber Gascoyne
The Hon. Charles Francis Greville
George Darby, First Naval Lord

1782 to 1801

1 April 1782: Commission.
The Hon. Augustus Keppel, First Lord
Sir Robert Harland, Bt, First Naval Lord
Hugh Pigot, Naval Lord
Viscount Duncannon
The Hon. John Townshend
Charles Brett
Richard Hopkins
18 July 1782: Commission.
The Viscount Keppel, First Lord
Sir Robert Harland, Bt, First Naval Lord
Hugh Pigot, Naval Lord
Charles Brett
Richard Hopkins
The Hon. John Jeffreys Pratt
John Aubrey
30 January 1783: Commission.
The Viscount Howe, First Lord
Hugh Pigot, First Naval Lord
Charles Brett
Richard Hopkins
The Hon. John Jeffreys Pratt
John Aubrey
The Hon. John Leveson-Gower, Naval Lord
10 April 1783: Commission.
The Viscount Keppel, First Lord
Hugh Pigot, First Naval Lord
Viscount Duncannon
The Hon. John Townshend
Sir John Lindsay, Naval Lord
William Jolliffe
Whitshed Keene
31 December 1783: Commission.
The Viscount Howe, First Lord
Charles Brett
The Hon. John Jeffreys Pratt
The Hon. John Leveson-Gower, First Naval Lord
Lord Apsley
The Hon. Charles George Perceval
John Modyford Heywood
2 April 1784: Commission.
The Viscount Howe, First Lord
Charles Brett
Richard Hopkins
The Hon. John Jeffreys Pratt
The Hon. John Leveson-Gower, First Naval Lord
Lord Apsley
The Hon. Charles George Perceval
16 July 1788: Commission.
The Earl of Chatham, First Lord
Richard Hopkins
Viscount Bayham
The Hon. John Leveson-Gower, First Naval Lord
Lord Apsley
The Lord Arden
The Lord Hood, Naval Lord
12 August 1789: Commission.
The Earl of Chatham, First Lord
Richard Hopkins
The Lord Arden
The Lord Hood, First Naval Lord
Sir Francis Samuel Drake, Naval Lord
Viscount Belgrave
The Hon. John Thomas Townshend
19 January 1790: Commission.
The Earl of Chatham, First Lord
Richard Hopkins
The Lord Arden
The Lord Hood, First Naval Lord
Viscount Belgrave
The Hon. John Thomas Townshend
Alan Gardner, Naval Lord
27 June 1791: Commission.
The Earl of Chatham, First Lord
The Lord Arden
The Lord Hood, First Naval Lord
The Hon. John Thomas Townshend
Alan Gardner, Naval Lord
John Smyth
Charles Small Pybus
26 April 1793: Commission.
The Earl of Chatham, First Lord
The Lord Arden
The Lord Hood, First Naval Lord
Alan Gardner, Naval Lord
John Smyth
Charles Small Pybus
Philip Affleck, Naval Lord
12 May 1794: Commission.
The Earl of Chatham, First Lord
The Lord Arden
The Lord Hood, First Naval Lord
Alan Gardner, Naval Lord
Charles Small Pybus
Philip Affleck, Naval Lord
Sir Charles Middleton, Bt, Naval Lord
19 December 1794: Commission.
The Earl Spencer, First Lord
The Lord Arden
The Lord Hood, First Naval Lord
Sir Alan Gardner, Bt, Naval Lord
Charles Small Pybus
Philip Affleck, Naval Lord
Sir Charles Middleton, Bt, Naval Lord
7 March 1795: Commission
The Earl Spencer, First Lord
The Lord Arden
Charles Small Pybus
Sir Charles Middleton, Bt, First Naval Lord
Lord Hugh Seymour
Philip Stephens
James Gambier, Naval Lord
20 November 1795: Commission
The Earl Spencer, First Lord
The Lord Arden
Charles Small Pybus
Lord Hugh Seymour
Sir Philip Stephens, Bt
James Gambier, First Naval Lord
William Young, Naval Lord
25 July 1797: Commission
The Earl Spencer, First Lord
The Lord Arden
Lord Hugh Seymour
Sir Philip Stephens, Bt
James Gambier, First Naval Lord
William Young, Naval Lord
Thomas Wallace
10 September 1798: Commission
The Earl Spencer, First Lord
The Lord Arden
Sir Philip Stephens, Bt
James Gambier, First Naval Lord
William Young, Naval Lord
Thomas Wallace
Robert Mann, Naval Lord
10 July 1800: Commission
The Earl Spencer, First Lord
The Lord Arden
Sir Philip Stephens, Bt
James Gambier, First Naval Lord
William Young, Naval Lord
Robert Mann, Naval Lord
The Hon. William Eliot

1801 to 1822

19 February 1801: Commission.
The Earl of St Vincent, First Lord
Sir Philip Stephens, Bt
The Hon. William Eliot
Sir Thomas Troubridge, Bt, First Naval Lord
James Adams
John Markham, Naval Lord
William Garthshore
17 January 1804: Commission.
The Earl of St Vincent, First Lord
Sir Philip Stephens, Bt
Sir Thomas Troubridge, Bt, First Naval Lord
James Adams
John Markham, Naval Lord
John Lemon
Sir Harry Burrard-Neale, Bt, Naval Lord
15 May 1804: Commission.
The Viscount Melville, First Lord
Sir Philip Stephens, Bt
James Gambier, First Naval Lord
Sir Harry Burrard-Neale, Bt, Naval Lord
Sir John Colpoys, Naval Lord
Philip Patton, Naval Lord
William Dickinson
13 September 1804: Commission.
The Viscount Melville, First Lord
Sir Philip Stephens, Bt
James Gambier, First Naval Lord
Sir John Colpoys, Naval Lord
Philip Patton, Naval Lord
William Dickinson
Sir Evan Nepean, Bt
2 May 1805: Commission.
The Lord Barham, First Lord
Sir Philip Stephens, Bt
James Gambier, First Naval Lord
Philip Patton, Naval Lord
William Dickinson
Sir Evan Nepean, Bt
Lord Garlies, Naval Lord
10 February 1806: Commission.
The Hon. Charles Grey, First Lord
Sir Philip Stephens, Bt
John Markham, First Naval Lord
Sir Charles Morice Pole, Bt, Naval Lord
Sir Harry Burrard-Neale, Bt, Naval Lord
Lord William Russell
The Lord Kensington
29 September 1806: Commission.
Thomas Grenville, First Lord
Sir Philip Stephens, Bt
John Markham, First Naval Lord
Sir Charles Morice Pole, Bt, Naval Lord
Sir Harry Burrard-Neale, Bt, Naval Lord
Lord William Russell
The Lord Kensington
23 October 1806: Commission.
Thomas Grenville, First Lord
John Markham, First Naval Lord
Sir Harry Burrard-Neale, Bt, Naval Lord
Lord William Russell
The Lord Kensington
Thomas Fremantle, Naval Lord
William Frankland
6 April 1807: Commission.
The Lord Mulgrave, First Lord
James Gambier, First Naval Lord
Sir Richard Bickerton, Bt, Naval Lord
William Johnstone Hope, Naval Lord
Robert Plumer Ward
The Viscount Palmerston
James Buller
9 May 1808: Commission.
The Lord Mulgrave, First Lord
Sir Richard Bickerton, Bt, First Naval Lord
William Johnstone Hope, Naval Lord
Robert Plumer Ward
The Viscount Palmerston
James Buller
William Domett, Naval Lord
30 March 1809: Commission.
The Lord Mulgrave, First Lord
Sir Richard Bickerton, Bt, First Naval Lord
Robert Plumer Ward
The Viscount Palmerston
James Buller
William Domett, Naval Lord
Robert Moorsom, Naval Lord
24 November 1809: Commission.
The Lord Mulgrave, First Lord
Sir Richard Bickerton, Bt, First Naval Lord
Robert Plumer Ward
James Buller
William Domett, Naval Lord
Robert Moorsom, Naval Lord
Viscount Lowther
4 May 1810: Commission.
Charles Philip Yorke, First Lord
Sir Richard Bickerton, Bt, First Naval Lord
Robert Plumer Ward
James Buller
William Domett, Naval Lord
Robert Moorsom, Naval Lord
Viscount Lowther
3 July 1810: Commission.
Charles Philip Yorke, First Lord
Sir Richard Bickerton, Bt, First Naval Lord
Robert Plumer Ward
James Buller
William Domett, Naval Lord
Sir Joseph Sydney Yorke, Naval Lord
The Hon. Frederick John Robinson
17 June 1811: Commission.
Charles Philip Yorke, First Lord
Sir Richard Bickerton, Bt, First Naval Lord
James Buller
William Domett, Naval Lord
Sir Joseph Sidney Yorke, Naval Lord
The Hon. Frederick John Robinson
Lord Walpole
25 March 1812: Commission.
The Viscount Melville, First Lord
William Domett, First Naval Lord
Sir Joseph Sydney Yorke, Naval Lord
The Hon. Frederick John Robinson
Lord Walpole
William Dundas
George Johnstone Hope, Naval Lord
5 October 1812: Commission.
The Viscount Melville, First Lord
William Domett, First Naval Lord
Sir Joseph Sydney Yorke, Naval Lord
William Dundas
George Johnstone Hope, Naval Lord
Sir George Warrender, Bt
John Osborn
18 May 1813: Commission.
The Viscount Melville, First Lord
William Domett, First Naval Lord
Sir Joseph Sydney Yorke, Naval Lord
William Dundas
Sir George Warrender, Bt
John Osborn
Lord Henry Paulet, Naval Lord
23 October 1813: Commission.
The Viscount Melville, First Lord
Sir Joseph Sydney Yorke, First Naval Lord
William Dundas
George Johnstone Hope, Naval Lord
Sir George Warrender, Bt
John Osborn
Lord Henry Paulet, Naval Lord
23 August 1814: Commission.
The Viscount Melville, First Lord
Sir Joseph Sydney Yorke, First Naval Lord
George Johnstone Hope, Naval Lord
Sir George Warrender, Bt
John Osborn
Lord Henry Paulet, Naval Lord
Barrington Pope Blachford
24 May 1816: Commission.
The Viscount Melville, First Lord
Sir Joseph Sydney Yorke, Naval Lord
George Johnstone Hope, Naval Lord
Sir George Warrender, Bt
John Osborn
Sir Graham Moore, First Naval Lord
Marquess of Worcester
2 April 1818: Commission.
The Viscount Melville, First Lord
Sir George Warrender, Bt
John Osborn
Sir Graham Moore, First Naval Lord
Marquess of Worcester
Sir George Cockburn, Naval Lord
The Hon. Sir Henry Hotham, Naval Lord
15 March 1819: Commission.
The Viscount Melville, First Lord
Sir George Warrender, Bt
Sir John Osborn, Bt
Sir Graham Moore, First Naval Lord
Sir George Cockburn, Naval Lord
The Hon. Sir Henry Hotham, Naval Lord
Sir George Clerk, Bt
13 March 1820: Commission.
The Viscount Melville, First Lord
Sir William Johnstone Hope, First Naval Lord
Sir George Warrender, Bt
Sir John Osborn, Bt
Sir George Cockburn, Naval Lord
The Hon. Sir Henry Hotham, Naval Lord
Sir George Clerk, Bt

1822 to 1841

8 February 1822: Commission.
The Viscount Melville, First Lord
Sir William Johnstone Hope, First Naval Lord
Sir John Osborn, Bt
Sir George Cockburn, Naval Lord
The Hon. Sir Henry Hotham, Naval Lord
Sir George Clerk, Bt, Civil Lord
William Robert Keith Douglas
23 March 1822: Commission.
The Viscount Melville, First Lord
Sir William Johnstone Hope, First Naval Lord
Sir John Osborn, Bt
Sir George Cockburn, Naval Lord
Sir George Clerk, Bt, Civil Lord
16 February 1824: Commission.
The Viscount Melville, First Lord
Sir William Johnstone Hope, First Naval Lord
Sir George Cockburn, Naval Lord
Sir George Clerk, Bt, Civil Lord
William Robert Keith Douglas
2 May 1827: The Duke of Clarence and St Andrews, Lord High Admiral
Council of the Lord High Admiral, 2 May 1827:
Sir William Johnstone Hope Senior Member
Sir George Cockburn
William Robert Keith Douglas
John Evelyn Denison
Council of the Lord High Admiral, 4 February 1828:
Sir William Johnstone Hope Senior Member
Sir George Cockburn
Sir George Clerk, Bt, Civil Lord
Earl of Brecknock
Council of the Lord High Admiral, 12 March 1828:
Sir George Cockburn Senior Member
Sir George Clerk, Bt, Civil Lord
Earl of Brecknock
Sir Edward William Campbell Rich Owen
19 September 1828: Commission.
The Viscount Melville, First Lord
Sir George Cockburn, First Naval Lord
The Hon. Sir Henry Hotham, Naval Lord
Sir George Clerk, Bt, Civil Lord
Earl of Brecknock
15 July 1829: Commission.
The Viscount Melville, First Lord
Sir George Cockburn, First Naval Lord
The Hon. Sir Henry Hotham, Naval Lord
Sir George Clerk, Bt, Civil Lord
Viscount Castlereagh, Civil Lord
31 July 1830: Commission.
The Viscount Melville, First Lord
Sir George Cockburn, First Naval Lord
The Hon. Sir Henry Hotham, Naval Lord
Viscount Castlereagh, Civil Lord
Charles Ross, Civil Lord
25 November 1830: Commission.
Sir James Graham, Bt, First Lord
Sir Thomas Masterman Hardy, First Naval Lord
The Hon. George Heneage Lawrence Dundas, Second Naval Lord
Sir Samuel John Brooke Pechell, Third Naval Lord
The Hon. George Barrington, Fourth Naval Lord
8 June 1832: Commission.
Sir James Graham, Bt, First Lord
Sir Thomas Masterman Hardy, First Naval Lord
The Hon. George Heneage Lawrence Dundas, Second Naval Lord
Sir Samuel John Brooke Pechell, Third Naval Lord
The Hon. George Barrington, Fourth Naval Lord
Henry Labouchere, Civil Lord
13 April 1833: Commission.
Sir James Graham, Bt, First Lord
Sir Thomas Masterman Hardy, First Naval Lord
The Hon. George Heneage Lawrence Dundas, Second Naval Lord
Sir Samuel John Brooke Pechell, Third Naval Lord
Henry Labouchere, Civil Lord
Maurice Frederick FitzHardinge Berkeley, Fourth Naval Lord
11 June 1834: Commission.
The Earl of Auckland, First Lord
Sir Thomas Masterman Hardy, First Naval Lord
The Hon. George Heneage Lawrence Dundas, Second Naval Lord
Sir Samuel John Brooke Pechell, Third Naval Lord
Henry Labouchere, Civil Lord
Maurice Frederick FitzHardinge Berkeley, Fourth Naval Lord
1 August 1834: Commission.
The Earl of Auckland, First Lord
The Hon. George Heneage Lawrence Dundas, First Naval Lord
Sir William Parker, Second Naval Lord
Sir Samuel John Brooke Pechell, Third Naval Lord
Henry Labouchere, Civil Lord
Maurice Frederick FitzHardinge Berkeley, Fourth Naval Lord
1 November 1834: Commission.
The Earl of Auckland, First Lord
Charles Adam, First Naval Lord
Sir William Parker, Second Naval Lord
Sir Samuel John Brooke Pechell, Third Naval Lord
Henry Labouchere, Civil Lord
Maurice Frederick FitzHardinge Berkeley, Fourth Naval Lord
23 December 1834: Commission.
The Earl de Grey, First Lord
Sir George Cockburn, First Naval Lord
Sir John Poo Beresford, Bt, Second Naval Lord
Sir Charles Rowley, Third Naval Lord
Lord Ashley, Civil Lord
Maurice FitzGerald, Civil Lord
25 April 1835: Commission.
The Earl of Auckland, First Lord
Charles Adam, First Naval Lord
Sir William Parker, Second Naval Lord
The Hon. George Elliot, Third Naval Lord
Sir Edward Troubridge, Bt, Fourth Naval Lord
Lord Dalmeny, Civil Lord
19 September 1835: Commission.
The Earl of Minto, First Lord
Sir Charles Adam, First Naval Lord
Sir William Parker, Second Naval Lord
The Hon. George Elliot, Third Naval Lord
Sir Edward Troubridge, Bt, Fourth Naval Lord
Lord Dalmeny, Civil Lord
22 July 1837: Commission.
The Earl of Minto, First Lord
Sir Charles Adam, First Naval Lord
Sir William Parker, Second Naval Lord
Sir Edward Troubridge, Bt, Third Naval Lord
Lord Dalmeny, Civil Lord
Maurice Frederick FitzHardinge Berkeley, Fourth Naval Lord
5 March 1839: Commission.
The Earl of Minto, First Lord
Sir Charles Adam, First Naval Lord
Sir William Parker, Second Naval Lord
Sir Edward Troubridge, Bt, Third Naval Lord
Sir Samuel John Brooke Pechell, Fourth Naval Lord
Lord Dalmeny, Civil Lord

1841 to 1861

25 June 1841: Commission.
The Earl of Minto, First Lord
Sir Charles Adam, First Naval Lord
Sir Edward Troubridge, Bt, Second Naval Lord
Sir Samuel Pechell, Third Naval Lord
Lord Dalmeny, Civil Lord
James Whitley Deans Dundas, Fourth Naval Lord
8 September 1841: Commission.
The Earl of Haddington, First Lord
Sir George Cockburn, First Naval Lord
Sir William Hall Gage, Second Naval Lord
Sir George Seymour, Third Naval Lord
The Hon. William Gordon, Fourth Naval Lord
The Hon. Henry Lowry-Corry, Civil Lord
22 May 1844: Commission.
The Earl of Haddington, First Lord
Sir George Cockburn, First Naval Lord
Sir William Hall Gage, Second Naval Lord
William Bowles, Third Naval Lord
The Hon. William Gordon, Fourth Naval Lord
The Hon. Henry Lowry-Corry, Civil Lord
12 February 1845: Commission.
The Earl of Haddington, First Lord
Sir George Cockburn, First Naval Lord
Sir William Hall Gage, Second Naval Lord
William Bowles, Third Naval Lord
The Hon. William Gordon, Fourth Naval Lord
The Hon. Henry Fitzroy
13 January 1846: Commission.
The Earl of Ellenborough, First Lord
Sir George Cockburn, First Naval Lord
Sir William Hall Gage, Second Naval Lord
William Bowles, Third Naval Lord
The Hon. William Gordon, Fourth Naval Lord
The Hon. Henry Fitzroy
17 February 1846: Commission.
The Earl of Ellenborough, First Lord
Sir George Cockburn, First Naval Lord
Sir William Hall Gage, Second Naval Lord
William Bowles, Third Naval Lord
The Hon. Henry Fitzroy
The Hon. Henry John Rous, Fourth Naval Lord
13 July 1846: Commission.
The Earl of Auckland, First Lord
Sir William Parker, Bt, First Naval Lord
James Whitley Deans Dundas, Second Naval Lord
Maurice FitzHardinge Berkeley, Third Naval Lord
Lord John Hay, Fourth Naval Lord
The Hon. William Francis Cowper, Civil Lord
24 July 1846: Commission.
The Earl of Auckland, First Lord
Sir Charles Adam, First Naval Lord
James Whitley Deans Dundas, Second Naval Lord
Maurice FitzHardinge Berkeley, Third Naval Lord
Lord John Hay, Fourth Naval Lord
The Hon. William Francis Cowper, Civil Lord
20 July 1847: Commission.
The Earl of Auckland, First Lord
James Whitley Deans Dundas, First Naval Lord
Henry Prescott, Second Naval Lord
Maurice FitzHardinge Berkeley, Third Naval Lord
Lord John Hay, Fourth Naval Lord
The Hon. William Francis Cowper, Civil Lord
23 December 1847: Commission.
The Earl of Auckland, First Lord
James Whitley Deans Dundas, First Naval Lord
Maurice FitzHardinge Berkeley, Second Naval Lord
Lord John Hay, Third Naval Lord
The Hon. William Francis Cowper, Civil Lord
Alexander Milne, Fourth Naval Lord
18 January 1849: Commission.
Sir Francis Thornhill Baring, First Lord
James Whitley Deans Dundas, First Naval Lord
Maurice FitzHardinge Berkeley, Second Naval Lord
Lord John Hay, Third Naval Lord
The Hon. William Francis Cowper, Civil Lord
Alexander Milne, Fourth Naval Lord
9 February 1850: Commission.
Sir Francis Thornhill Baring, First Lord
James Whitley Deans Dundas, First Naval Lord
Maurice FitzHardinge Berkeley, Second Naval Lord
Houston Stewart, Third Naval Lord
Alexander Milne, Fourth Naval Lord
The Hon. William Francis Cowper, Civil Lord
13 February 1852: Commission.
Sir Francis Thornhill Baring, First Lord
Maurice FitzHardinge Berkeley, First Naval Lord
Houston Stewart, Second Naval Lord
Sir James Stirling, Third Naval Lord
The Hon. William Francis Cowper, Civil Lord
2 March 1852: Commission.
The Duke of Northumberland, First Lord
Hyde Parker, First Naval Lord
Phipps Hornby, Second Naval Lord
Sir Thomas Herbert, Third Naval Lord
The Hon. Arthur Duncombe, Fourth Naval Lord
Alexander Milne, Fifth Naval Lord
5 January 1853: Commission.
Sir James Robert George Graham, Bt, First Lord
Hyde Parker, First Naval Lord
Maurice FitzHardinge Berkeley, Second Naval Lord
The Hon. Richard Saunders Dundas, Third Naval Lord
Alexander Milne, Fourth Naval Lord
The Hon. William Francis Cowper, Civil Lord
3 June 1854: Commission.
Sir James Robert George Graham, Bt, First Lord
Maurice FitzHardinge Berkeley, First Naval Lord
The Hon. Richard Saunders Dundas, Second Naval Lord
Peter Richards, Third Naval Lord
Alexander Milne, Fourth Naval Lord
The Hon. William Francis Cowper, Civil Lord
8 March 1855: Commission.
Sir Charles Wood, Bt, First Lord
Maurice FitzHardinge Berkeley, First Naval Lord
Henry Eden, Second Naval Lord
Peter Richards, Third Naval Lord
Alexander Milne, Fourth Naval Lord
14 March 1855: Commission.
Sir Charles Wood, Bt, First Lord
Maurice FitzHardinge Berkeley, First Naval Lord
Henry Eden, Second Naval Lord
Peter Richards, Third Naval Lord
Alexander Milne, Fourth Naval Lord
Sir Robert Peel, Civil Lord
2 April 1857: Commission.
Sir Charles Wood, Bt, First Lord
Sir Maurice FitzHardinge Berkeley, First Naval Lord
The Hon. Sir Richard Saunders Dundas, Second Naval Lord
Henry Eden, Third Naval Lord
Alexander Milne, Fourth Naval Lord
Sir Robert Peel, Civil Lord
30 May 1857: Commission.
Sir Charles Wood, Bt, First Lord
Sir Maurice FitzHardinge Berkeley, First Naval Lord
The Hon. Sir Richard Saunders Dundas, Second Naval Lord
Henry Eden, Third Naval Lord
Alexander Milne, Fourth Naval Lord
Thomas George Baring, Civil Lord
24 November 1857: Commission.
Sir Charles Wood, Bt, First Lord
The Hon. Sir Richard Saunders Dundas, First Naval Lord
Henry Eden, Second Naval Lord
Alexander Milne, Third Naval Lord
The Hon. Frederick Thomas Pelham, Fourth Naval Lord
Thomas George Baring, Civil Lord
8 March 1858: Commission
Sir John Somerset Pakington, Bt, First Lord
William Fanshawe Martin, First Naval Lord
The Hon. Sir Richard Saunders Dundas, Second Naval Lord
Alexander Milne, Third Naval Lord
The Hon. James Robert Drummond, Fourth Naval Lord
Lord Lovaine, Civil Lord
28 January 1859: Commission
Sir John Somerset Pakington, Bt, First Lord
William Fanshawe Martin, First Naval Lord
The Hon. Sir Richard Saunders Dundas, Second Naval Lord
Alexander Milne, Third Naval Lord
The Hon. Swynfen Thomas Carnegie, Fourth Naval Lord
Lord Lovaine, Civil Lord
11 March 1859: Commission
Sir John Somerset Pakington, Bt, First Lord
William Fanshawe Martin, First Naval Lord
The Hon. Sir Richard Saunders Dundas, Second Naval Lord
Alexander Milne, Third Naval Lord
The Hon. Swynfen Thomas Carnegie, Fourth Naval Lord
The Hon. Frederick Lygon, Civil Lord
23 April 1859: Commission
Sir John Somerset Pakington, Bt, First Lord
William Fanshawe Martin, First Naval Lord
The Hon. Sir Richard Saunders Dundas, Second Naval Lord
Sir Henry John Leeke, Third Naval Lord
Alexander Milne, Fourth Naval Lord
The Hon. Frederick Lygon, Civil Lord
28 June 1859: Commission
The Duke of Somerset, First Lord
The Hon. Sir Richard Saunders Dundas, First Naval Lord
The Hon. Frederick Thomas Pelham, Second Naval Lord
Charles Eden, Third Naval Lord
Charles Frederick, Fourth Naval Lord
Samuel Whitbread, Civil Lord
15 June 1861: Commission
The Duke of Somerset, First Lord
The Hon. Sir Frederick William Grey, First Naval Lord
Charles Eden, Second Naval Lord
Charles Frederick, Third Naval Lord
The Hon. James Robert Drummond, Fourth Naval Lord
Samuel Whitbread, Civil Lord

1861 to 1882

27 March 1863: Commission.
The Duke of Somerset, First Lord
The Hon. Sir Frederick William Grey, First Naval Lord
Charles Eden, Second Naval Lord
Charles Frederick, Third Naval Lord
The Hon. James Robert Drummond, Fourth Naval Lord
Marquess of Hartington, Civil Lord
5 May 1863: Commission.
The Duke of Somerset, First Lord
The Hon. Sir Frederick William Grey, First Naval Lord
Charles Eden, Second Naval Lord
Charles Frederick, Third Naval Lord
The Hon. James Robert Drummond, Fourth Naval Lord
James Stansfeld, Civil Lord
22 April 1864: Commission.
The Duke of Somerset, First Lord
The Hon. Sir Frederick William Grey, First Naval Lord
Charles Eden, Second Naval Lord
Charles Frederick, Third Naval Lord
The Hon. James Robert Drummond, Fourth Naval Lord
Hugh Childers, Civil Lord
25 March 1865: Commission.
The Duke of Somerset, First Lord
The Hon. Sir Frederick William Grey, First Naval Lord
Charles Eden, Second Naval Lord
Edward Gennys Fanshawe, Third Naval Lord
The Hon. James Robert Drummond, Fourth Naval Lord
Hugh Childers, Civil Lord
23 January 1866: Commission.
The Duke of Somerset, First Lord
The Hon. Sir Frederick William Grey, First Naval Lord
Charles Eden, Second Naval Lord
Edward Gennys Fanshawe, Third Naval Lord
The Hon. James Robert Drummond, Fourth Naval Lord
Henry Fenwick, Civil Lord
10 April 1866: Commission.
The Duke of Somerset, First Lord
The Hon. Sir Frederick William Grey, First Naval Lord
Charles Eden, Second Naval Lord
Edward Gennys Fanshawe, Third Naval Lord
The Hon. James Robert Drummond, Fourth Naval Lord
Lord John Hay, Fifth Naval Lord
9 May 1866: Commission.
The Duke of Somerset, First Lord
The Hon. Sir Frederick William Grey, First Naval Lord
Charles Eden, Second Naval Lord
Edward Gennys Fanshawe, Third Naval Lord
The Hon. James Robert Drummond, Fourth Naval Lord
George John Shaw-Lefevre, Civil Lord
13 July 1866: Commission.
Sir John Somerset Pakington, Bt, First Lord
Sir Alexander Milne, First Naval Lord
Sir Sydney Colpoys Dacres, Second Naval Lord
George Henry Seymour, Third Naval Lord
Sir John Charles Dalrymple Hay, Bt, Fourth Naval Lord
Charles du Cane, Civil Lord
8 March 1867: Commission.
The Hon. Henry Lowry-Corry, First Lord
Sir Alexander Milne, First Naval Lord
Sir Sydney Colpoys Dacres, Second Naval Lord
George Henry Seymour, Third Naval Lord
Sir John Charles Dalrymple Hay, Bt, Fourth Naval Lord
Charles du Cane, Civil Lord
3 September 1868: Commission.
The Hon. Henry Lowry-Corry, First Lord
Sir Alexander Milne, First Naval Lord
Sir Sydney Colpoys Dacres, Second Naval Lord
George Henry Seymour, Third Naval Lord
Sir John Charles Dalrymple Hay, Bt, Fourth Naval Lord
The Hon. Frederick Arthur Stanley, Civil Lord
18 December 1868: Commission.
Hugh Childers, First Lord
Sir Sydney Colpoys Dacres, First Naval Lord
Sir Robert Spencer Robinson, Third Lord
Lord John Hay, Junior Naval Lord
George Otto Trevelyan, Civil Lord
12 July 1870: Commission.
Hugh Childers, First Lord
Sir Sydney Colpoys Dacres, First Naval Lord
Sir Robert Spencer Robinson, Third Lord
Lord John Hay, Junior Naval Lord
The Earl of Camperdown, Civil Lord
9 February 1871: Commission
Hugh Childers, First Lord
Sir Sydney Colpoys Dacres, First Naval Lord
Robert Hall, Third Lord
Lord John Hay, Junior Naval Lord
The Earl of Camperdown, Civil Lord
9 March 1871: Commission
George Goschen, First Lord
Sir Sydney Colpoys Dacres, First Naval Lord
Robert Hall, Third Lord
Lord John Hay, Junior Naval Lord
The Earl of Camperdown, Civil Lord
28 June 1871: Commission
George Goschen, First Lord
Sir Sydney Colpoys Dacres, First Naval Lord
Robert Hall, Third Lord
John Walter Tarleton, Junior Naval Lord
The Earl of Camperdown, Civil Lord
4 May 1872: Commission
George Goschen, First Lord
Sir Sydney Colpoys Dacres, First Naval Lord
John Walter Tarleton, Second Naval Lord
Frederick Seymour, Junior Naval Lord
The Earl of Camperdown, Civil Lord
27 November 1872: Commission
George Goschen, First Lord
Sir Alexander Milne, First Naval Lord
John Walter Tarleton, Second Naval Lord
Frederick Seymour, Junior Naval Lord
The Earl of Camperdown, Civil Lord
4 March 1874: Commission
George Ward Hunt, First Lord
Sir Alexander Milne, First Naval Lord
John Walter Tarleton, Second Naval Lord
Lord Gillford, Junior Naval Lord
Sir Massey Lopes, Civil Lord
29 December 1874: Commission
George Ward Hunt, First Lord
Sir Alexander Milne, First Naval Lord
Geoffrey Hornby, Second Naval Lord
Lord Gillford, Junior Naval Lord
Sir Massey Lopes, Civil Lord
7 September 1876: Commission
George Ward Hunt, First Lord
Sir Hastings Yelverton, First Naval Lord
Geoffrey Hornby, Second Naval Lord
Lord Gillford, Junior Naval Lord
Sir Massey Lopes, Civil Lord
11 January 1877: Commission
George Ward Hunt, First Lord
Sir Hastings Yelverton, First Naval Lord
Arthur Acland Hood, Second Naval Lord
Lord Gillford, Junior Naval Lord
Sir Massey Lopes, Civil Lord
14 August 1877: Commission
William Henry Smith, First Lord
Sir Hastings Yelverton, First Naval Lord
Arthur Acland Hood, Second Naval Lord
Lord Gillford, Junior Naval Lord
Sir Massey Lopes, Civil Lord
5 November 1877: Commission
William Henry Smith, First Lord
George Wellesley, First Naval Lord
Arthur Acland Hood, Second Naval Lord
Lord Gillford, Junior Naval Lord
Sir Massey Lopes, Civil Lord
12 August 1879: Commission
William Henry Smith, First Lord
Sir Astley Cooper Key, First Naval Lord
Arthur Acland Hood, Second Naval Lord
Lord Gillford, Junior Naval Lord
Sir Massey Lopes, Civil Lord
4 December 1879: Commission
William Henry Smith, First Lord
Sir Astley Cooper Key, First Naval Lord
The Earl of Clanwilliam, Second Naval Lord
Sir John Commerell, Junior Naval Lord
Sir Massey Lopes, Civil Lord
12 May 1880: Commission
The Earl of Northbrook, First Lord
Sir Astley Cooper Key, First Naval Lord
Lord John Hay, Second Naval Lord
Anthony Hoskins, Junior Naval Lord
Thomas Brassey, Civil Lord
12 April 1882: Commission
The Earl of Northbrook, First Lord
Sir Astley Cooper Key, First Naval Lord
Lord John Hay, Second Naval Lord
Thomas Brandreth, Third Lord
Anthony Hoskins, Junior Naval Lord
22 July 1882: Commission
The Earl of Northbrook, First Lord
Sir Astley Cooper Key, First Naval Lord
Lord John Hay, Second Naval Lord
Thomas Brandreth, Third Lord
Sir Frederick William Richards, Junior Naval Lord
Sir Thomas Brassey, Civil Lord
George Wightwick Rendel, Civil Lord

1882 to 1901
3 March 1883: Commission
The Earl of Northbrook, First Lord
Sir Astley Cooper Key, First Naval Lord
The Lord Alcester, Second Naval Lord
Thomas Brandreth, Third Lord
Sir Frederick William Richards, Junior Naval Lord
Sir Thomas Brassey, Civil Lord
George Wightwick Rendel, Civil Lord
24 November 1884: Commission
The Earl of Northbrook, First Lord
Sir Astley Cooper Key, First Naval Lord
The Lord Alcester, Second Naval Lord
Thomas Brandreth, Third Lord
Sir Frederick William Richards, Junior Naval Lord
William Sproston Caine, Civil Lord
George Wightwick Rendel, Civil Lord
25 May 1885: Commission
The Earl of Northbrook, First Lord
Sir Astley Cooper Key, First Naval Lord
The Lord Alcester, Second Naval Lord
Sir William Hewett, Junior Naval Lord
Thomas Brandreth, Third Lord
William Sproston Caine, Civil Lord
George Wightwick Rendel, Civil Lord
1 July 1885: Commission
Lord George Hamilton, First Lord
Arthur Acland Hood, First Naval Lord
Sir Anthony Hoskins, Second Naval Lord
Thomas Brandreth, Third Lord
William Codrington, Junior Naval Lord
Ellis Ashmead-Bartlett, Civil Lord
15 February 1886: Commission
The Marquess of Ripon, First Lord
Lord John Hay, First Naval Lord
Sir Anthony Hoskins, Second Naval Lord
William Graham, Third Lord
James Elphinstone Erskine, Junior Naval Lord
Robert William Duff, Civil Lord
9 August 1886: Commission
Lord George Hamilton, First Lord
Sir Arthur Acland Hood, First Naval Lord
Sir Anthony Hoskins, Second Naval Lord
William Graham, Third Lord
Lord Charles Beresford, Junior Naval Lord
Ellis Ashmead-Bartlett, Civil Lord
30 January 1888: Commission
Lord George Hamilton, First Lord
Sir Arthur Acland Hood, First Naval Lord
Sir Anthony Hoskins, Second Naval Lord
William Graham, Third Lord
Charles Frederick Hotham, Junior Naval Lord
Ellis Ashmead-Bartlett, Civil Lord
30 July 1888: Commission
Lord George Hamilton, First Lord
Sir Arthur Acland Hood, First Naval Lord
Sir Anthony Hoskins, Second Naval Lord
John Ommanney Hopkins, Third Lord
Charles Frederick Hotham, Junior Naval Lord
Ellis Ashmead-Bartlett, Civil Lord
24 October 1889: Commission
Lord George Hamilton, First Lord
Sir Richard Vesey Hamilton, First Naval Lord
Henry Fairfax, Second Naval Lord
John Ommanney Hopkins, Third Lord
Charles Frederick Hotham, Junior Naval Lord
Ellis Ashmead-Bartlett, Civil Lord
16 December 1889: Commission
Lord George Hamilton, First Lord
Sir Richard Vesey Hamilton, First Naval Lord
Henry Fairfax, Second Naval Lord
John Ommanney Hopkins, Third Lord
Frederick Bedford, Junior Naval Lord
Ellis Ashmead-Bartlett, Civil Lord
28 September 1891: Commission
Lord George Hamilton, First Lord
Sir Anthony Hoskins, First Naval Lord
Henry Fairfax, Second Naval Lord
John Ommanney Hopkins, Third Lord
Frederick Bedford, Junior Naval Lord
Ellis Ashmead-Bartlett, Civil Lord
1 February 1892: Commission
Lord George Hamilton, First Lord
Sir Anthony Hoskins, First Naval Lord
Henry Fairfax, Second Naval Lord
John Arbuthnot Fisher, Third Lord
Frederick Bedford, Junior Naval Lord
Ellis Ashmead-Bartlett, Civil Lord
25 August 1892: Commission
The Earl Spencer, First Lord
Sir Anthony Hoskins, First Naval Lord
Sir Frederick William Richards, Second Naval Lord
John Arbuthnot Fisher, Third Lord
Lord Walter Kerr, Junior Naval Lord
Edmund Robertson, Civil Lord
1 November 1893: Commission
The Earl Spencer, First Lord
Sir Frederick William Richards, First Naval Lord
Lord Walter Kerr, Second Naval Lord
John Arbuthnot Fisher, Third Lord
Gerard Henry Uchtred Noel, Junior Naval Lord
Edmund Robertson, Civil Lord
6 May 1895: Commission
The Earl Spencer, First Lord
Sir Frederick William Richards, First Naval Lord
Sir Frederick Bedford, Second Naval Lord
John Arbuthnot Fisher, Third Lord
Gerard Henry Uchtred Noel, Junior Naval Lord
Edmund Robertson, Civil Lord
6 July 1895: Commission
George Goschen, First Lord
Sir Frederick William Richards, First Naval Lord
Sir Frederick Bedford, Second Naval Lord
John Arbuthnot Fisher, Third Lord
Gerard Henry Uchtred Noel, Junior Naval Lord
Austen Chamberlain, Civil Lord
August 1897
George Goschen, First Lord
Sir Frederick William Richards, First Naval Lord
Sir Frederick Bedford, Second Naval Lord
Arthur Knyvet Wilson, Third Lord
Gerard Henry Uchtred Noel, Junior Naval Lord
Austen Chamberlain, Civil Lord
1898
George Goschen, First Lord
Sir Frederick William Richards, First Naval Lord
Sir Frederick Bedford, Second Naval Lord
Arthur Knyvet Wilson, Third Lord
Arthur William Moore, Junior Naval Lord
Austen Chamberlain, Civil Lord
May 1899
George Goschen, First Lord
Sir Frederick William Richards, First Naval Lord
Lord Walter Kerr, Second Naval Lord
Arthur Knyvet Wilson, Third Lord
Arthur William Moore, Junior Naval Lord
Austen Chamberlain, Civil Lord
August 1899
George Goschen, First Lord
Lord Walter Kerr, First Naval Lord
Archibald Lucius Douglas, Second Naval Lord
Arthur Knyvet Wilson, Third Lord
Arthur William Moore, Junior Naval Lord
Austen Chamberlain, Civil Lord
12 November 1900
The Earl of Selborne, First Lord
Lord Walter Kerr, First Naval Lord
Archibald Lucius Douglas, Second Naval Lord
Arthur Knyvet Wilson, Third Lord
Arthur William Moore, Junior Naval Lord
Ernest George Pretyman, Civil Lord
1901
The Earl of Selborne, First Lord
Lord Walter Kerr, First Naval Lord
Archibald Lucius Douglas, Second Naval Lord
Arthur Knyvet Wilson, Third Lord
John Durnford, Junior Naval Lord
Ernest George Pretyman, Civil Lord

1901 to 1921
June 1902
The Earl of Selborne, First Lord
Lord Walter Kerr, First Naval Lord
Sir John A. Fisher, Second Naval Lord
Arthur Knyvet Wilson, Third Lord
John Durnford, Junior Naval Lord
Ernest George Pretyman, Civil Lord
13 October 1903: Commission
The Earl of Selborne, First Lord
Lord Walter Kerr, First Naval Lord
Sir Charles Carter Drury, Second Naval Lord
William Henry May, Third Lord
John Durnford, Junior Naval Lord
Arthur Lee, Civil Lord
1 December 1903: Commission
The Earl of Selborne, First Lord
Lord Walter Kerr, First Naval Lord
Sir Charles Carter Drury, Second Naval Lord
William Henry May, Third Lord
Frederick Inglefield, Junior Naval Lord
Arthur Lee, Civil Lord
21 October 1904
The Earl of Selborne, First Lord
Sir John A. Fisher, First Sea Lord
Sir Charles Carter Drury, Second Sea Lord
William Henry May, Third Sea Lord
Frederick Inglefield, Fourth Sea Lord
Arthur Lee, Civil Lord
February 1905
The Earl of Selborne, First Lord
Sir John A. Fisher, First Sea Lord
Sir Charles Carter Drury, Second Sea Lord
Henry Bradwardine Jackson, Third Sea Lord
Frederick Inglefield, Fourth Sea Lord
Arthur Lee, Civil Lord
27 March 1905
The Earl Cawdor, First Lord
Sir John A. Fisher, First Sea Lord
Sir Charles Carter Drury, Second Sea Lord
Henry Bradwardine Jackson, Third Sea Lord
Frederick Inglefield, Fourth Sea Lord
Arthur Lee, Civil Lord
22 December 1905: Commission
The Lord Tweedmouth, First Lord
Sir John A. Fisher, First Sea Lord
Sir Charles Carter Drury, Second Sea Lord
Henry Bradwardine Jackson, Third Sea Lord
Frederick Inglefield, Fourth Sea Lord
George Lambert, Civil Lord
20 March 1907: Commission
The Lord Tweedmouth, First Lord
Sir John A. Fisher, First Sea Lord
Sir William Henry May, Second Sea Lord
Henry Bradwardine Jackson, Third Sea Lord
Alfred Winsloe, Fourth Sea Lord
George Lambert, Civil Lord
16 April 1908: Commission
Reginald McKenna, First Lord
Sir John A. Fisher, First Sea Lord
Sir William Henry May, Second Sea Lord
Henry Bradwardine Jackson, Third Sea Lord
Alfred Winsloe, Fourth Sea Lord
George Lambert, Civil Lord
16 October 1908: Commission
Reginald McKenna, First Lord
Sir John A. Fisher, First Sea Lord
Sir William Henry May, Second Sea Lord
Sir John Jellicoe, Third Sea Lord
Alfred Winsloe, Fourth Sea Lord
George Lambert, Civil Lord
25 March 1909: Commission
Reginald McKenna, First Lord
Sir John A. Fisher, First Sea Lord
Sir Francis Bridgeman, Second Sea Lord
Sir John Jellicoe, Third Sea Lord
Alfred Winsloe, Fourth Sea Lord
George Lambert, Civil Lord
25 January 1910: Commission
Reginald McKenna, First Lord
Sir Arthur Knyvet Wilson, First Sea Lord
Sir Francis Bridgeman, Second Sea Lord
Sir John Jellicoe, Third Sea Lord
Charles Madden, Fourth Sea Lord
George Lambert, Civil Lord
20 December 1910: Commission
Reginald McKenna, First Lord
Sir Arthur Knyvet Wilson, First Sea Lord
Sir Francis Bridgeman, Second Sea Lord
Charles John Briggs, Third Sea Lord
Charles Madden, Fourth Sea Lord
George Lambert, Civil Lord
25 March 1911: Commission
Reginald McKenna, First Lord
Sir Arthur Knyvet Wilson, First Sea Lord
Sir George Le Clerc Egerton, Second Sea Lord
Charles John Briggs, Third Sea Lord
Charles Madden, Fourth Sea Lord
George Lambert, Civil Lord
24 October 1911: Commission
Winston Churchill, First Lord
Sir Arthur Knyvet Wilson, First Sea Lord
Sir George Le Clerc Egerton, Second Sea Lord
Charles John Briggs, Third Sea Lord
Charles Madden, Fourth Sea Lord
George Lambert, Civil Lord
5 December 1911: Commission
Winston Churchill, First Lord
Sir Francis Bridgeman, First Sea Lord
Prince Louis of Battenberg, Second Sea Lord
Charles John Briggs, Third Sea Lord
William Christopher Pakenham, Fourth Sea Lord
George Lambert, Civil Lord
18 January 1912: Commission
Winston Churchill, First Lord
Sir Francis Bridgeman, First Sea Lord
Prince Louis of Battenberg, Second Sea Lord
Charles John Briggs, Third Sea Lord
William Christopher Pakenham, Fourth Sea Lord
George Lambert, Civil Lord
Sir Francis Hopwood, Civil Lord
29 May 1912: Commission
Winston Churchill, First Lord
Sir Francis Bridgeman, First Sea Lord
Prince Louis of Battenberg, Second Sea Lord
Gordon Moore, Third Sea Lord
William Christopher Pakenham, Fourth Sea Lord
George Lambert, Civil Lord
Sir Francis Hopwood, Civil Lord
9 December 1912: Commission
Winston Churchill, First Lord
Prince Louis of Battenberg, First Sea Lord
Sir John Jellicoe, Second Sea Lord
Gordon Moore, Third Sea Lord
William Christopher Pakenham, Fourth Sea Lord
George Lambert, Civil Lord
Sir Francis Hopwood, Civil Lord
1 December 1913: Commission
Winston Churchill, First Lord
Prince Louis of Battenberg, First Sea Lord
Sir John Jellicoe, Second Sea Lord
Gordon Moore, Third Sea Lord
Cecil Lambert, Fourth Sea Lord
George Lambert, Civil Lord
Sir Francis Hopwood, Civil Lord
30 July 1914: Commission
Winston Churchill, First Lord
Prince Louis of Battenberg, First Sea Lord
Sir Frederick Tower Hamilton, Second Sea Lord
Gordon Moore, Third Sea Lord
Cecil Lambert, Fourth Sea Lord
George Lambert, Civil Lord
Sir Francis Hopwood, Civil Lord
September 1914
Winston Churchill, First Lord
Prince Louis of Battenberg, First Sea Lord
Sir Frederick Tower Hamilton, Second Sea Lord
Frederick Charles Tudor Tudor, Third Sea Lord
Cecil Lambert, Fourth Sea Lord
George Lambert, Civil Lord
Sir Francis Hopwood, Civil Lord
30 October 1914: Commission
Winston Churchill, First Lord
The Lord Fisher, First Sea Lord
Sir Frederick Tower Hamilton, Second Sea Lord
Frederick Charles Tudor Tudor, Third Sea Lord
Cecil Lambert, Fourth Sea Lord
George Lambert, Civil Lord
Sir Francis Hopwood, Civil Lord
28 May 1915: Commission
Arthur Balfour, First Lord
Sir Henry Bradwardine Jackson, First Sea Lord
Sir Frederick Tower Hamilton, Second Sea Lord
Frederick Charles Tudor Tudor, Third Sea Lord
Cecil Lambert, Fourth Sea Lord
Sir Francis Hopwood, Civil Lord
3 June 1915: Commission
Arthur Balfour, First Lord
Sir Henry Bradwardine Jackson, First Sea Lord
Sir Frederick Tower Hamilton, Second Sea Lord
Frederick Charles Tudor Tudor, Third Sea Lord
Cecil Lambert, Fourth Sea Lord
The Duke of Devonshire, Civil Lord
Sir Francis Hopwood, Civil Lord
1 July 1916: Commission
Arthur Balfour, First Lord
Sir Henry Bradwardine Jackson, First Sea Lord
Sir Somerset Arthur Gough-Calthorpe, Second Sea Lord
Frederick Charles Tudor Tudor, Third Sea Lord
Cecil Lambert, Fourth Sea Lord
The Duke of Devonshire, Civil Lord
Sir Francis Hopwood, Civil Lord
31 August 1916: Commission
Arthur Balfour, First Lord
Sir Henry Bradwardine Jackson, First Sea Lord
Sir Somerset Arthur Gough-Calthorpe, Second Sea Lord
Frederick Charles Tudor Tudor, Third Sea Lord
Cecil Lambert, Fourth Sea Lord
The Earl of Lytton, Civil Lord
Sir Francis Hopwood, Civil Lord
4 December 1916: Commission
Arthur Balfour, First Lord
Sir John Jellicoe, First Sea Lord
Sir Cecil Burney, Second Sea Lord
Frederick Charles Tudor Tudor, Third Sea Lord
Lionel Halsey, Fourth Sea Lord
The Earl of Lytton, Civil Lord
Sir Francis Hopwood, Civil Lord
11 December 1916: Commission
Sir Edward Carson, First Lord
Sir John Jellicoe, First Sea Lord
Sir Cecil Burney, Second Sea Lord
Frederick Charles Tudor Tudor, Third Sea Lord
Lionel Halsey, Fourth Sea Lord
Ernest George Pretyman, Civil Lord
Sir Francis Hopwood, Civil Lord
11 January 1917: Commission
Sir Edward Carson, First Lord
Sir John Jellicoe, First Sea Lord
Sir Cecil Burney, Second Sea Lord
Frederick Charles Tudor Tudor, Third Sea Lord
Lionel Halsey, Fourth Sea Lord
Godfrey Paine, Fifth Sea Lord
Ernest George Pretyman, Civil Lord
Sir Francis Hopwood, Civil Lord
31 May 1917: Commission
Sir Edward Carson, First Lord
Sir John Jellicoe, First Sea Lord
Sir Cecil Burney, Second Sea Lord
Lionel Halsey, Third Sea Lord
Hugh Tothill, Fourth Sea Lord
Godfrey Paine, Fifth Sea Lord
Sir Henry Oliver, Deputy Chief of Naval Staff
Alexander Ludovic Duff, Assistant Chief of Naval Staff
Ernest George Pretyman, Civil Lord
Sir Eric Geddes, Admiralty Controller
Sir Francis Hopwood, Civil Lord
6 September 1917: Commission
Sir Eric Geddes, First Lord
Sir John Jellicoe, First Sea Lord
Sir Rosslyn Wemyss, Second Sea Lord
Lionel Halsey, Third Sea Lord
Hugh Tothill, Fourth Sea Lord
Godfrey Paine, Fifth Sea Lord
Sir Henry Oliver, Deputy Chief of Naval Staff
Alexander Ludovic Duff, Assistant Chief of Naval Staff
Ernest George Pretyman, Civil Lord
Sir Alan Anderson, Civil Lord
27 September 1917: Commission
Sir Eric Geddes, First Lord
Sir John Jellicoe, First Sea Lord
Sir Rosslyn Wemyss, Deputy First Sea Lord
Sir Herbert Heath, Second Sea Lord
Lionel Halsey, Third Sea Lord
Hugh Tothill, Fourth Sea Lord
Godfrey Paine, Fifth Sea Lord
Sir Henry Oliver, Deputy Chief of Naval Staff
Alexander Ludovic Duff, Assistant Chief of Naval Staff
Ernest George Pretyman, Civil Lord
Sir Alan Anderson, Admiralty Controller
10 January 1918: Commission
Sir Eric Geddes, First Lord
Sir Rosslyn Wemyss, First Sea Lord
George Price Webley Hope, Deputy First Sea Lord
Sir Herbert Heath, Second Sea Lord
Lionel Halsey, Third Sea Lord
Hugh Tothill, Fourth Sea Lord
Sydney Fremantle, Deputy Chief of Naval Staff
Sir Alexander Duff, Assistant Chief of Naval Staff
Ernest George Pretyman, Civil Lord
Sir Alan Anderson, Admiralty Controller
Arthur Francis Pease, Civil Lord
7 June 1918: Commission
Sir Eric Geddes, First Lord
Sir Rosslyn Wemyss, First Sea Lord
George Price Webley Hope, Deputy First Sea Lord
Sir Herbert Heath, Second Sea Lord
Charles de Bartolomé, Third Sea Lord
Hugh Tothill, Fourth Sea Lord
Sydney Fremantle, Deputy Chief of Naval Staff
Sir Alexander Duff, Assistant Chief of Naval Staff
Ernest George Pretyman, Civil Lord
Sir Alan Anderson, Admiralty Controller
Arthur Francis Pease, Civil Lord
Sir Robert Horne, Civil Lord
24 December 1918: Commission
Sir Eric Geddes, First Lord
Sir Rosslyn Wemyss, First Sea Lord
George Price Webley Hope, Deputy First Sea Lord
Sir Herbert Heath, Second Sea Lord
Charles de Bartolomé, Third Sea Lord
Hugh Tothill, Fourth Sea Lord
Sydney Fremantle, Deputy Chief of Naval Staff
Sir Alexander Duff, Assistant Chief of Naval Staff
Ernest George Pretyman, Civil Lord
Arthur Francis Pease, Civil Lord
Sir Robert Horne, Civil Lord
The Earl of Lytton, Civil Lord
16 January 1919: Commission
Walter Long, First Lord
Sir Rosslyn Wemyss, First Sea Lord
George Price Webley Hope, Deputy First Sea Lord
Sir Herbert Heath, Second Sea Lord
Charles de Bartolomé, Third Sea Lord
Sir Hugh Tothill, Fourth Sea Lord
Sydney Fremantle, Deputy Chief of Naval Staff
Sir Alexander Duff, Assistant Chief of Naval Staff
Arthur Francis Pease, Civil Lord
30 January 1919: Commission
Walter Long, First Lord
Sir Rosslyn Wemyss, First Sea Lord
George Price Webley Hope, Deputy First Sea Lord
Sir Herbert Heath, Second Sea Lord
Charles de Bartolomé, Third Sea Lord
Sir Hugh Tothill, Fourth Sea Lord
Sydney Fremantle, Deputy Chief of Naval Staff
Sir Alexander Duff, Assistant Chief of Naval Staff
The Earl of Lytton, Civil Lord
Arthur Francis Pease, Civil Lord
1 May 1919: Commission
Walter Long, First Lord
Sir Rosslyn Wemyss, First Sea Lord
George Price Webley Hope, Deputy First Sea Lord
Sir Montague Browning, Second Sea Lord
Charles de Bartolomé, Third Sea Lord
Sir Hugh Tothill, Fourth Sea Lord
James Andrew Fergusson, Deputy Chief of Naval Staff
Sir Alexander Duff, Assistant Chief of Naval Staff
The Earl of Lytton, Civil Lord
2 July 1919: Commission
Walter Long, First Lord
Sir Rosslyn Wemyss, First Sea Lord
George Price Webley Hope, Deputy First Sea Lord
Sir Montague Browning, Second Sea Lord
Sir William Nicholson, Third Sea Lord
Sir Ernle Chatfield, Fourth Sea Lord
James Andrew Fergusson, Deputy Chief of Naval Staff
Sir Alexander Duff, Assistant Chief of Naval Staff
The Earl of Lytton, Civil Lord
4 August 1919: Commission
Walter Long, First Lord
Sir Rosslyn Wemyss, First Sea Lord
Sir Montague Browning, Second Sea Lord
Sir William Nicholson, Third Sea Lord
Sir Ernle Chatfield, Fourth Sea Lord
Sir Osmond Brock, Deputy Chief of Naval Staff
James Andrew Fergusson, Assistant Chief of Naval Staff
The Earl of Lytton, Civil Lord
1 November 1919: Commission
Walter Long, First Lord
The Earl Beatty, First Sea Lord
Sir Montague Browning, Second Sea Lord
Sir William Nicholson, Third Sea Lord
Sir Ernle Chatfield, Fourth Sea Lord
Sir Osmond Brock, Deputy Chief of Naval Staff
James Andrew Fergusson, Assistant Chief of Naval Staff
The Earl of Lytton, Civil Lord
15 March 1920: Commission
Walter Long, First Lord
The Earl Beatty, First Sea Lord
Sir Montague Browning, Second Sea Lord
Sir William Nicholson, Third Sea Lord
The Hon. Algernon Boyle, Fourth Sea Lord
Sir Osmond Brock, Deputy Chief of Naval Staff
Sir Ernle Chatfield, Assistant Chief of Naval Staff
The Earl of Lytton, Civil Lord
15 April 1920: Commission
Walter Long, First Lord
The Earl Beatty, First Sea Lord
Sir Montague Browning, Second Sea Lord
Frederick Laurence Field, Third Sea Lord
The Hon. Algernon Boyle, Fourth Sea Lord
Sir Osmond Brock, Deputy Chief of Naval Staff
Sir Ernle Chatfield, Assistant Chief of Naval Staff
The Earl of Lytton, Civil Lord
30 September 1920: Commission
Walter Long, First Lord
The Earl Beatty, First Sea Lord
Sir Henry Oliver, Second Sea Lord
Frederick Laurence Field, Third Sea Lord
The Hon. Algernon Boyle, Fourth Sea Lord
Sir Osmond Brock, Deputy Chief of Naval Staff
Sir Ernle Chatfield, Assistant Chief of Naval Staff
The Earl of Lytton, Civil Lord
4 November 1920: Commission
Walter Long, First Lord
The Earl Beatty, First Sea Lord
Sir Henry Oliver, Second Sea Lord
Frederick Laurence Field, Third Sea Lord
The Hon. Algernon Boyle, Fourth Sea Lord
Sir Osmond Brock, Deputy Chief of Naval Staff
Sir Ernle Chatfield, Assistant Chief of Naval Staff
The Earl of Onslow, Civil Lord
18 February 1921: Commission
The Lord Lee of Fareham, First Lord
The Earl Beatty, First Sea Lord
Sir Henry Oliver, Second Sea Lord
Frederick Laurence Field, Third Sea Lord
The Hon. Algernon Boyle, Fourth Sea Lord
Sir Osmond Brock, Deputy Chief of Naval Staff
Sir Ernle Chatfield, Assistant Chief of Naval Staff
The Earl of Onslow, Civil Lord
1 November 1921: Commission
The Lord Lee of Fareham, First Lord
The Earl Beatty, First Sea Lord
Sir Henry Oliver, Second Sea Lord
Frederick Laurence Field, Third Sea Lord
The Hon. Algernon Boyle, Fourth Sea Lord
Sir Roger Keyes, Bt, Deputy Chief of Naval Staff
Sir Ernle Chatfield, Assistant Chief of Naval Staff
Bolton Eyres-Monsell, Civil Lord

1921 to 1941
31 October 1922: Commission
Leo Amery, First Lord
The Earl Beatty, First Sea Lord
Sir Henry Oliver, Second Sea Lord
Frederick Laurence Field, Third Sea Lord
The Hon. Algernon Boyle, Fourth Sea Lord
Sir Roger Keyes, Bt, Deputy Chief of Naval Staff
Sir Ernle Chatfield, Assistant Chief of Naval Staff
Bolton Eyres-Monsell, Civil Lord
2 November 1922: Commission
Leo Amery, First Lord
The Earl Beatty, First Sea Lord
Sir Henry Oliver, Second Sea Lord
Frederick Laurence Field, Third Sea Lord
The Hon. Algernon Boyle, Fourth Sea Lord
Sir Roger Keyes, Bt, Deputy Chief of Naval Staff
Sir Ernle Chatfield, Assistant Chief of Naval Staff
The Marquess of Linlithgow, Civil Lord
1 December 1922: Commission
Leo Amery, First Lord
The Earl Beatty, First Sea Lord
Sir Henry Oliver, Second Sea Lord
Frederick Laurence Field, Third Sea Lord
The Hon. Algernon Boyle, Fourth Sea Lord
Sir Roger Keyes, Bt, Deputy Chief of Naval Staff
Cyril Fuller, Assistant Chief of Naval Staff
The Marquess of Linlithgow, Civil Lord
15 May 1923: Commission
Leo Amery, First Lord
The Earl Beatty, First Sea Lord
Sir Henry Oliver, Second Sea Lord
Cyril Fuller, Third Sea Lord
The Hon. Algernon Boyle, Fourth Sea Lord
Sir Roger Keyes, Bt, Deputy Chief of Naval Staff
Arthur Waistell, Assistant Chief of Naval Staff
The Marquess of Linlithgow, Civil Lord
28 January 1924: Commission
The Viscount Chelmsford, First Lord
The Earl Beatty, First Sea Lord
Sir Henry Oliver, Second Sea Lord
Cyril Fuller, Third Sea Lord
The Hon. Algernon Boyle, Fourth Sea Lord
Sir Roger Keyes, Bt, Deputy Chief of Naval Staff
Arthur Waistell, Assistant Chief of Naval Staff
Frank Hodges, Civil Lord
1 April 1924: Commission
The Viscount Chelmsford, First Lord
The Earl Beatty, First Sea Lord
Sir Henry Oliver, Second Sea Lord
Cyril Fuller, Third Sea Lord
John Donald Kelly, Fourth Sea Lord
Sir Roger Keyes, Bt, Deputy Chief of Naval Staff
Arthur Waistell, Assistant Chief of Naval Staff
Frank Hodges, Civil Lord
15 August 1924: Commission
The Viscount Chelmsford, First Lord
The Earl Beatty, First Sea Lord
Sir Michael Culme-Seymour, Bt, Second Sea Lord
Cyril Fuller, Third Sea Lord
John Donald Kelly, Fourth Sea Lord
Sir Roger Keyes, Bt, Deputy Chief of Naval Staff
Arthur Waistell, Assistant Chief of Naval Staff
Frank Hodges, Civil Lord
7 November 1924: Commission
William Clive Bridgeman, First Lord
The Earl Beatty, First Sea Lord
Sir Michael Culme-Seymour, Bt, Second Sea Lord
Cyril Fuller, Third Sea Lord
John Donald Kelly, Fourth Sea Lord
Sir Roger Keyes, Bt, Deputy Chief of Naval Staff
Frederic Charles Dreyer, Assistant Chief of Naval Staff
18 November 1924: Commission
William Clive Bridgeman, First Lord
The Earl Beatty, First Sea Lord
Sir Michael Culme-Seymour, Bt, Second Sea Lord
Cyril Fuller, Third Sea Lord
John Donald Kelly, Fourth Sea Lord
Sir Roger Keyes, Bt, Deputy Chief of Naval Staff
Frederic Charles Dreyer, Assistant Chief of Naval Staff
The Earl Stanhope, Civil Lord
22 April 1925: Commission
William Clive Bridgeman, First Lord
The Earl Beatty, First Sea Lord
Sir Hubert Brand, Second Sea Lord
Cyril Fuller, Third Sea Lord
John Donald Kelly, Fourth Sea Lord
Sir Roger Keyes, Bt, Deputy Chief of Naval Staff
Frederic Charles Dreyer, Assistant Chief of Naval Staff
The Earl Stanhope, Civil Lord
30 April 1925: Commission
William Clive Bridgeman, First Lord
The Earl Beatty, First Sea Lord
Sir Hubert Brand, Second Sea Lord
Sir Ernle Chatfield, Third Sea Lord
John Donald Kelly, Fourth Sea Lord
Sir Roger Keyes, Bt, Deputy Chief of Naval Staff
Frederic Charles Dreyer, Assistant Chief of Naval Staff
The Earl Stanhope, Civil Lord
15 May 1925: Commission
William Clive Bridgeman, First Lord
The Earl Beatty, First Sea Lord
Sir Hubert Brand, Second Sea Lord
Sir Ernle Chatfield, Third Sea Lord
John Donald Kelly, Fourth Sea Lord
Sir Frederick Field, Deputy Chief of Naval Staff
Frederic Charles Dreyer, Assistant Chief of Naval Staff
The Earl Stanhope, Civil Lord
21 April 1927: Commission
William Clive Bridgeman, First Lord
The Earl Beatty, First Sea Lord
Sir Hubert Brand, Second Sea Lord
Sir Ernle Chatfield, Third Sea Lord
John Donald Kelly, Fourth Sea Lord
Sir Frederick Field, Deputy Chief of Naval Staff
Dudley Pound, Assistant Chief of Naval Staff
The Earl Stanhope, Civil Lord
30 April 1927: Commission
William Clive Bridgeman, First Lord
The Earl Beatty, First Sea Lord
William Wordsworth Fisher, Second Sea Lord
Sir Ernle Chatfield, Third Sea Lord
John Donald Kelly, Fourth Sea Lord
Sir Frederick Field, Deputy Chief of Naval Staff
Dudley Pound, Assistant Chief of Naval Staff
The Earl Stanhope, Civil Lord
30 July 1927: Commission
William Clive Bridgeman, First Lord
Sir Charles Madden, Bt, First Sea Lord
Sir Hubert Brand, Second Sea Lord
Sir Ernle Chatfield, Third Sea Lord
William Wordsworth Fisher, Fourth Sea Lord
Sir Frederick Field, Deputy Chief of Naval Staff
Dudley Pound, Assistant Chief of Naval Staff
The Earl Stanhope, Civil Lord
15 August 1927: Commission
William Clive Bridgeman, First Lord
Sir Charles Madden, Bt, First Sea Lord
Sir Michael Hodges, Second Sea Lord
Sir Ernle Chatfield, Third Sea Lord
William Wordsworth Fisher, Fourth Sea Lord
Sir Frederick Field, Deputy Chief of Naval Staff
Dudley Pound, Assistant Chief of Naval Staff
The Earl Stanhope, Civil Lord
2 April 1928: Commission
William Clive Bridgeman, First Lord
Sir Charles Madden, Bt, First Sea Lord
Sir Michael Hodges, Second Sea Lord
Sir Ernle Chatfield, Third Sea Lord
Vernon Haggard, Fourth Sea Lord
Sir Frederick Field, Deputy Chief of Naval Staff
Dudley Pound, Assistant Chief of Naval Staff
The Earl Stanhope, Civil Lord
1 May 1928: Commission
William Clive Bridgeman, First Lord
Sir Charles Madden, Bt, First Sea Lord
Sir Michael Hodges, Second Sea Lord
Sir Ernle Chatfield, Third Sea Lord
Vernon Haggard, Fourth Sea Lord
William Wordsworth Fisher, Deputy Chief of Naval Staff
Dudley Pound, Assistant Chief of Naval Staff
The Earl Stanhope, Civil Lord
1 November 1928: Commission
William Clive Bridgeman, First Lord
Sir Charles Madden, Bt, First Sea Lord
Sir Michael Hodges, Second Sea Lord
Roger Backhouse, Third Sea Lord
Vernon Haggard, Fourth Sea Lord
William Wordsworth Fisher, Deputy Chief of Naval Staff
Dudley Pound, Assistant Chief of Naval Staff
The Earl Stanhope, Civil Lord
22 April 1929: Commission
William Clive Bridgeman, First Lord
Sir Charles Madden, Bt, First Sea Lord
Sir Michael Hodges, Second Sea Lord
Roger Backhouse, Third Sea Lord
Vernon Haggard, Fourth Sea Lord
William Wordsworth Fisher, Deputy Chief of Naval Staff
The Earl Stanhope, Civil Lord
10 June 1929: Commission
A. V. Alexander, First Lord
Sir Charles Madden, Bt, First Sea Lord
Sir Michael Hodges, Second Sea Lord
Roger Backhouse, Third Sea Lord
Vernon Haggard, Fourth Sea Lord
William Wordsworth Fisher, Deputy Chief of Naval Staff
George Henry Hall, Civil Lord
21 April 1930: Commission
A. V. Alexander, First Lord
Sir Charles Madden, Bt, First Sea Lord
Sir Michael Hodges, Second Sea Lord
Roger Backhouse, Third Sea Lord
Lionel Preston, Fourth Sea Lord
Sir William Wordsworth Fisher, Deputy Chief of Naval Staff
Charles Ammon, Parliamentary and Financial Secretary to the Admiralty
George Henry Hall, Civil Lord
26 May 1930: Commission
A. V. Alexander, First Lord
Sir Charles Madden, Bt, First Sea Lord
Sir Cyril Fuller, Second Sea Lord
Roger Backhouse, Third Sea Lord
Lionel Preston, Fourth Sea Lord
Sir William Wordsworth Fisher, Deputy Chief of Naval Staff
Charles Ammon, Parliamentary and Financial Secretary to the Admiralty
George Henry Hall, Civil Lord
30 June 1930: Commission
A. V. Alexander, First Lord
Sir Charles Madden, Bt, First Sea Lord
Sir Cyril Fuller, Second Sea Lord
Roger Backhouse, Third Sea Lord
Lionel Preston, Fourth Sea Lord
Frederic Dreyer, Deputy Chief of Naval Staff
Charles Ammon, Parliamentary and Financial Secretary to the Admiralty
George Henry Hall, Civil Lord
30 July 1930: Commission
A. V. Alexander, First Lord
Sir Frederick Field, First Sea Lord
Sir Cyril Fuller, Second Sea Lord
Roger Backhouse, Third Sea Lord
Lionel Preston, Fourth Sea Lord
Frederic Dreyer, Deputy Chief of Naval Staff
Charles Ammon, Parliamentary and Financial Secretary to the Admiralty
George Henry Hall, Civil Lord
27 August 1931: Commission
Sir Austen Chamberlain, First Lord
Sir Frederick Field, First Sea Lord
Sir Cyril Fuller, Second Sea Lord
Roger Backhouse, Third Sea Lord
Lionel Preston, Fourth Sea Lord
Frederic Dreyer, Deputy Chief of Naval Staff
7 September 1931: Commission
Sir Austen Chamberlain, First Lord
Sir Frederick Field, First Sea Lord
Sir Cyril Fuller, Second Sea Lord
Roger Backhouse, Third Sea Lord
Lionel Preston, Fourth Sea Lord
Frederic Dreyer, Deputy Chief of Naval Staff
The Earl Stanhope, Parliamentary and Financial Secretary to the Admiralty
9 November 1931: Commission
Sir Bolton Eyres-Monsell, First Lord
Sir Frederick Field, First Sea Lord
Sir Cyril Fuller, Second Sea Lord
Roger Backhouse, Third Sea Lord
Lionel Preston, Fourth Sea Lord
Frederic Dreyer, Deputy Chief of Naval Staff
The Earl Stanhope, Parliamentary and Financial Secretary to the Admiralty
11 November 1931: Commission
Sir Bolton Eyres-Monsell, First Lord
Sir Frederick Field, First Sea Lord
Sir Cyril Fuller, Second Sea Lord
Roger Backhouse, Third Sea Lord
Lionel Preston, Fourth Sea Lord
Frederic Dreyer, Deputy Chief of Naval Staff
Lord Stanley, Parliamentary and Financial Secretary to the Admiralty
Euan Wallace, Civil Lord
1 March 1932: Commission
Sir Bolton Eyres-Monsell, First Lord
Sir Frederick Field, First Sea Lord
Sir Cyril Fuller, Second Sea Lord
Charles Forbes, Third Sea Lord
Lionel Preston, Fourth Sea Lord
Frederic Dreyer, Deputy Chief of Naval Staff
Lord Stanley, Parliamentary and Financial Secretary to the Admiralty
Euan Wallace, Civil Lord
31 August 1932: Commission
Sir Bolton Eyres-Monsell, First Lord
Sir Frederick Field, First Sea Lord
Dudley Pound, Second Sea Lord
Charles Forbes, Third Sea Lord
Lionel Preston, Fourth Sea Lord
Frederic Dreyer, Deputy Chief of Naval Staff
Lord Stanley, Parliamentary and Financial Secretary to the Admiralty
Euan Wallace, Civil Lord
20 September 1932: Commission
Sir Bolton Eyres-Monsell, First Lord
Sir Frederick Field, First Sea Lord
Dudley Pound, Second Sea Lord
Charles Forbes, Third Sea Lord
Geoffrey Blake, Fourth Sea Lord
Sir Frederic Dreyer, Deputy Chief of Naval Staff
Lord Stanley, Parliamentary and Financial Secretary to the Admiralty
Euan Wallace, Civil Lord
9 January 1933: Commission
Sir Bolton Eyres-Monsell, First Lord
Sir Frederick Field, First Sea Lord
Dudley Pound, Second Sea Lord
Charles Forbes, Third Sea Lord
Geoffrey Blake, Fourth Sea Lord
Charles Little, Deputy Chief of Naval Staff
Lord Stanley, Parliamentary and Financial Secretary to the Admiralty
Euan Wallace, Civil Lord
21 January 1933: Commission
Sir Bolton Eyres-Monsell, First Lord
Sir Ernle Chatfield, First Sea Lord
Dudley Pound, Second Sea Lord
Charles Forbes, Third Sea Lord
Geoffrey Blake, Fourth Sea Lord
Charles Little, Deputy Chief of Naval Staff
Lord Stanley, Parliamentary and Financial Secretary to the Admiralty
Euan Wallace, Civil Lord
23 April 1934: Commission
Sir Bolton Eyres-Monsell, First Lord
Sir Ernle Chatfield, First Sea Lord
Sir Dudley Pound, Second Sea Lord
Reginald Henderson, Third Sea Lord
Geoffrey Blake, Fourth Sea Lord
Charles Little, Deputy Chief of Naval Staff
Lord Stanley, Parliamentary and Financial Secretary to the Admiralty
Euan Wallace, Civil Lord
15 February 1935: Commission
Sir Bolton Eyres-Monsell, First Lord
Sir Ernle Chatfield, First Sea Lord
Sir Dudley Pound, Second Sea Lord
Reginald Henderson, Third Sea Lord
Percy Noble, Fourth Sea Lord
Charles Little, Deputy Chief of Naval Staff
Lord Stanley, Parliamentary and Financial Secretary to the Admiralty
Euan Wallace, Civil Lord
24 June 1935: Commission
Sir Bolton Eyres-Monsell, First Lord
Sir Ernle Chatfield, First Sea Lord
Sir Dudley Pound, Second Sea Lord
Reginald Henderson, Third Sea Lord
Percy Noble, Fourth Sea Lord
Charles Little, Deputy Chief of Naval Staff
Charles Kennedy-Purvis, Assistant Chief of Naval Staff
Sir Victor Warrender, Bt, Parliamentary and Financial Secretary to the Admiralty
Kenneth Lindsay, Civil Lord
30 September 1935: Commission
Sir Bolton Eyres-Monsell, First Lord
Sir Ernle Chatfield, First Sea Lord
Sir Martin Dunbar-Nasmith, Second Sea Lord
Reginald Henderson, Third Sea Lord
Percy Noble, Fourth Sea Lord
Sir Charles Little, Deputy Chief of Naval Staff
Charles Kennedy-Purvis, Assistant Chief of Naval Staff
Sir Victor Warrender, Bt, Parliamentary and Financial Secretary to the Admiralty
Kenneth Lindsay, Civil Lord
29 October 1935: Commission
Sir Bolton Eyres-Monsell, First Lord
Sir Ernle Chatfield, First Sea Lord
Sir Martin Dunbar-Nasmith, Second Sea Lord
Reginald Henderson, Third Sea Lord
Percy Noble, Fourth Sea Lord
William Milbourne James, Deputy Chief of Naval Staff
Charles Kennedy-Purvis, Assistant Chief of Naval Staff
Sir Victor Warrender, Bt, Parliamentary and Financial Secretary to the Admiralty
Kenneth Lindsay, Civil Lord
3 December 1935: Commission
The Viscount Monsell, First Lord
Sir Ernle Chatfield, First Sea Lord
Sir Martin Dunbar-Nasmith, Second Sea Lord
Reginald Henderson, Third Sea Lord
Percy Noble, Fourth Sea Lord
William Milbourne James, Deputy Chief of Naval Staff
Charles Kennedy-Purvis, Assistant Chief of Naval Staff
Lord Stanley, Parliamentary and Financial Secretary to the Admiralty
Kenneth Lindsay, Civil Lord
6 June 1936: Commission
Sir Samuel Hoare, Bt, First Lord
Sir Ernle Chatfield, First Sea Lord
Sir Martin Dunbar-Nasmith, Second Sea Lord
Sir Reginald Henderson, Third Sea Lord
Percy Noble, Fourth Sea Lord
Sir William Milbourne James, Deputy Chief of Naval Staff
Charles Kennedy-Purvis, Assistant Chief of Naval Staff
Lord Stanley, Parliamentary and Financial Secretary to the Admiralty
Kenneth Lindsay, Civil Lord
2 October 1936: Commission
Sir Samuel Hoare, Bt, First Lord
Sir Ernle Chatfield, First Sea Lord
Sir Martin Dunbar-Nasmith, Second Sea Lord
Sir Reginald Henderson, Third Sea Lord
Sir Percy Noble, Fourth Sea Lord
Sir William Milbourne James, Deputy Chief of Naval Staff
John H. D. Cunningham, Assistant Chief of Naval Staff
Lord Stanley, Parliamentary and Financial Secretary to the Admiralty
Kenneth Lindsay, Civil Lord
1 October 1937: Commission
Duff Cooper, First Lord
The Lord Chatfield, First Sea Lord
Sir Martin Dunbar-Nasmith, Second Sea Lord
Sir Reginald Henderson, Third Sea Lord
Geoffrey Arbuthnot, Fourth Sea Lord
Sir William Milbourne James, Deputy Chief of Naval Staff
John H. D. Cunningham, Assistant Chief of Naval Staff
Geoffrey Hithersay Shakespeare, Parliamentary and Financial Secretary to the Admiralty
John Jestyn Llewellin, Civil Lord
19 July 1938: Commission
Duff Cooper, First Lord
The Lord Chatfield, First Sea Lord
Sir Martin Dunbar-Nasmith, Second Sea Lord
Sir Reginald Henderson, Third Sea Lord
Geoffrey Arbuthnot, Fourth Sea Lord
The Hon. Sir Alexander Ramsay, Fifth Sea Lord
Sir William Milbourne James, Deputy Chief of Naval Staff
Geoffrey Hithersay Shakespeare, Parliamentary and Financial Secretary to the Admiralty
John Jestyn Llewellin, Civil Lord
7 September 1938: Commission
Duff Cooper, First Lord
Sir Roger Backhouse, First Sea Lord
Sir Martin Dunbar-Nasmith, Second Sea Lord
Sir Reginald Henderson, Third Sea Lord
Geoffrey Arbuthnot, Fourth Sea Lord
The Hon. Sir Alexander Ramsay, Fifth Sea Lord
Sir William Milbourne James, Deputy Chief of Naval Staff
Geoffrey Hithersay Shakespeare, Parliamentary and Financial Secretary to the Admiralty
John Jestyn Llewellin, Civil Lord
30 September 1938: Commission
Duff Cooper, First Lord
Sir Roger Backhouse, First Sea Lord
Sir Charles Little, Second Sea Lord
Sir Reginald Henderson, Third Sea Lord
Geoffrey Arbuthnot, Fourth Sea Lord
The Hon. Sir Alexander Ramsay, Fifth Sea Lord
Sir William Milbourne James, Deputy Chief of Naval Staff
Geoffrey Hithersay Shakespeare, Parliamentary and Financial Secretary to the Admiralty
John Jestyn Llewellin, Civil Lord
27 October 1938: Commission
The Earl Stanhope, First Lord
Sir Roger Backhouse, First Sea Lord
Sir Charles Little, Second Sea Lord
Sir Reginald Henderson, Third Sea Lord
Geoffrey Arbuthnot, Fourth Sea Lord
The Hon. Sir Alexander Ramsay, Fifth Sea Lord
Sir William Milbourne James, Deputy Chief of Naval Staff
Geoffrey Hithersay Shakespeare, Parliamentary and Financial Secretary to the Admiralty
John Jestyn Llewellin, Civil Lord
14 November 1938: Commission
The Earl Stanhope, First Lord
Sir Roger Backhouse, First Sea Lord
Sir Charles Little, Second Sea Lord
Sir Reginald Henderson, Third Sea Lord
Geoffrey Arbuthnot, Fourth Sea Lord
The Hon. Sir Alexander Ramsay, Fifth Sea Lord
Andrew Cunningham, Deputy Chief of Naval Staff
Geoffrey Hithersay Shakespeare, Parliamentary and Financial Secretary to the Admiralty
John Jestyn Llewellin, Civil Lord
1 March 1939: Commission
The Earl Stanhope, First Lord
Sir Roger Backhouse, First Sea Lord
Sir Charles Little, Second Sea Lord
Bruce Fraser, Third Sea Lord
Geoffrey Arbuthnot, Fourth Sea Lord
The Hon. Sir Alexander Ramsay, Fifth Sea Lord
Andrew Cunningham, Deputy Chief of Naval Staff
Geoffrey Hithersay Shakespeare, Parliamentary and Financial Secretary to the Admiralty
John Jestyn Llewellin, Civil Lord
1 June 1939: Commission
The Earl Stanhope, First Lord
Sir Roger Backhouse, First Sea Lord
Sir Charles Little, Second Sea Lord
Bruce Fraser, Third Sea Lord
Geoffrey Arbuthnot, Fourth Sea Lord
The Hon. Sir Alexander Ramsay, Fifth Sea Lord
Tom Phillips, Deputy Chief of Naval Staff
Geoffrey Hithersay Shakespeare, Parliamentary and Financial Secretary to the Admiralty
John Jestyn Llewellin, Civil Lord
12 June 1939: Commission
The Earl Stanhope, First Lord
Sir Dudley Pound, First Sea Lord
Sir Charles Little, Second Sea Lord
Bruce Fraser, Third Sea Lord
Geoffrey Arbuthnot, Fourth Sea Lord
The Hon. Sir Alexander Ramsay, Fifth Sea Lord
Tom Phillips, Deputy Chief of Naval Staff
Geoffrey Hithersay Shakespeare, Parliamentary and Financial Secretary to the Admiralty
John Jestyn Llewellin, Civil Lord
15 July 1939: Commission
The Earl Stanhope, First Lord
Sir Dudley Pound, First Sea Lord
Sir Charles Little, Second Sea Lord
Bruce Fraser, Third Sea Lord
Geoffrey Arbuthnot, Fourth Sea Lord
The Hon. Sir Alexander Ramsay, Fifth Sea Lord
Tom Phillips, Deputy Chief of Naval Staff
Geoffrey Hithersay Shakespeare, Parliamentary and Financial Secretary to the Admiralty
Austin Uvedale Morgan Hudson, Civil Lord
3 September 1939: Commission
Winston Churchill, First Lord
Sir Dudley Pound, First Sea Lord
Sir Charles Little, Second Sea Lord
Bruce Fraser, Third Sea Lord
Geoffrey Arbuthnot, Fourth Sea Lord
The Hon. Sir Alexander Ramsay, Fifth Sea Lord
Tom Phillips, Deputy Chief of Naval Staff
Harold Burrough, Assistant Chief of Naval Staff
Geoffrey Hithersay Shakespeare, Parliamentary and Financial Secretary to the Admiralty
Austin Uvedale Morgan Hudson, Civil Lord
21 November 1939: Commission
Winston Churchill, First Lord
Sir Dudley Pound, First Sea Lord
Sir Charles Little, Second Sea Lord
Bruce Fraser, Third Sea Lord
Geoffrey Arbuthnot, Fourth Sea Lord
Guy Royle, Fifth Sea Lord
Tom Phillips, Deputy Chief of Naval Staff
Harold Burrough, Assistant Chief of Naval Staff
Geoffrey Hithersay Shakespeare, Parliamentary and Financial Secretary to the Admiralty
Austin Uvedale Morgan Hudson, Civil Lord
1 February 1940: Commission
Winston Churchill, First Lord
Sir Dudley Pound, First Sea Lord
Sir Charles Little, Second Sea Lord
Bruce Fraser, Third Sea Lord
Geoffrey Arbuthnot, Fourth Sea Lord
Guy Royle, Fifth Sea Lord
Tom Phillips, Deputy Chief of Naval Staff
Harold Burrough, Assistant Chief of Naval Staff
Geoffrey Hithersay Shakespeare, Parliamentary and Financial Secretary to the Admiralty
Austin Uvedale Morgan Hudson, Civil Lord
Sir James Lithgow, Bt, Controller of Merchant Shipbuilding and Repairs
4 April 1940: Commission
Winston Churchill, First Lord
Sir Dudley Pound, First Sea Lord
Sir Charles Little, Second Sea Lord
Bruce Fraser, Third Sea Lord
Geoffrey Arbuthnot, Fourth Sea Lord
Guy Royle, Fifth Sea Lord
Tom Phillips, Deputy Chief of Naval Staff
Harold Burrough, Assistant Chief of Naval Staff
Sir Victor Warrender, Bt, Parliamentary and Financial Secretary to the Admiralty
Austin Uvedale Morgan Hudson, Civil Lord
Sir James Lithgow, Bt, Controller of Merchant Shipbuilding and Repairs
8 April 1940: Commission
Winston Churchill, First Lord
Sir Dudley Pound, First Sea Lord
Sir Charles Little, Second Sea Lord
Bruce Fraser, Third Sea Lord
Geoffrey Arbuthnot, Fourth Sea Lord
Guy Royle, Fifth Sea Lord
Tom Phillips, Deputy Chief of Naval Staff
Harold Burrough, Assistant Chief of Naval Staff
Sir Geoffrey Blake, Assistant Chief of Naval Staff (Foreign)
Sir Victor Warrender, Bt, Parliamentary and Financial Secretary to the Admiralty
Austin Uvedale Morgan Hudson, Civil Lord
Sir James Lithgow, Bt, Controller of Merchant Shipbuilding and Repairs
12 May 1940: Commission
A. V. Alexander, First Lord
Sir Dudley Pound, First Sea Lord
Sir Charles Little, Second Sea Lord
Bruce Fraser, Third Sea Lord
Geoffrey Arbuthnot, Fourth Sea Lord
Guy Royle, Fifth Sea Lord
Tom Phillips, Deputy Chief of Naval Staff
Harold Burrough, Assistant Chief of Naval Staff
Sir Geoffrey Blake, Assistant Chief of Naval Staff (Foreign)
Sir Victor Warrender, Bt, Parliamentary and Financial Secretary to the Admiralty
Austin Uvedale Morgan Hudson, Civil Lord
Sir James Lithgow, Bt, Controller of Merchant Shipbuilding and Repairs
27 May 1940: Commission
A. V. Alexander, First Lord
Sir Dudley Pound, First Sea Lord
Sir Charles Little, Second Sea Lord
Bruce Fraser, Third Sea Lord
Geoffrey Arbuthnot, Fourth Sea Lord
Guy Royle, Fifth Sea Lord
Tom Phillips, Deputy Chief of Naval Staff
Harold Burrough, Assistant Chief of Naval Staff
Sir Geoffrey Blake, Assistant Chief of Naval Staff (Foreign)
Arthur Power, Assistant Chief of Naval Staff (Home)
Sir Victor Warrender, Bt, Parliamentary and Financial Secretary to the Admiralty
Austin Uvedale Morgan Hudson, Civil Lord
Sir James Lithgow, Bt, Controller of Merchant Shipbuilding and Repairs
25 July 1940: Commission
A. V. Alexander, First Lord
Sir Dudley Pound, First Sea Lord
Sir Charles Little, Second Sea Lord
Bruce Fraser, Third Sea Lord
Geoffrey Arbuthnot, Fourth Sea Lord
Guy Royle, Fifth Sea Lord
Tom Phillips, Deputy Chief of Naval Staff
Henry Moore, Assistant Chief of Naval Staff (Trade)
Sir Geoffrey Blake, Assistant Chief of Naval Staff (Foreign)
Arthur Power, Assistant Chief of Naval Staff (Home)
Sir Victor Warrender, Bt, Parliamentary and Financial Secretary to the Admiralty
Austin Uvedale Morgan Hudson, Civil Lord
Sir James Lithgow, Bt, Controller of Merchant Shipbuilding and Repairs
2 December 1940: Commission
A. V. Alexander, First Lord
Sir Dudley Pound, First Sea Lord
Sir Charles Little, Second Sea Lord
Bruce Fraser, Third Sea Lord
Geoffrey Arbuthnot, Fourth Sea Lord
Guy Royle, Fifth Sea Lord
Tom Phillips, Deputy Chief of Naval Staff
Henry Moore, Assistant Chief of Naval Staff (Trade)
Sir Henry Harwood, Assistant Chief of Naval Staff (Foreign)
Arthur Power, Assistant Chief of Naval Staff (Home)
Sir Victor Warrender, Bt, Parliamentary and Financial Secretary to the Admiralty
Austin Uvedale Morgan Hudson, Civil Lord
Sir James Lithgow, Bt, Controller of Merchant Shipbuilding and Repairs
5 December 1940: Commission
A. V. Alexander, First Lord
Sir Dudley Pound, First Sea Lord
Sir Charles Little, Second Sea Lord
Bruce Fraser, Third Sea Lord
Geoffrey Arbuthnot, Fourth Sea Lord
Guy Royle, Fifth Sea Lord
Tom Phillips, Deputy Chief of Naval Staff
Henry Moore, Assistant Chief of Naval Staff (Trade)
Sir Henry Harwood, Assistant Chief of Naval Staff (Foreign)
Arthur Power, Assistant Chief of Naval Staff (Home)
Sir Victor Warrender, Bt, Parliamentary and Financial Secretary to the Admiralty
Austin Uvedale Morgan Hudson, Civil Lord
Sir James Lithgow, Bt, Controller of Merchant Shipbuilding and Repairs
Henry Vaughan Markham, Permanent Secretary to the Admiralty
1 April 1941: Commission
A. V. Alexander, First Lord
Sir Dudley Pound, First Sea Lord
Sir Charles Little, Second Sea Lord
Bruce Fraser, Third Sea Lord
John H. D. Cunningham, Fourth Sea Lord
Sir Guy Royle, Fifth Sea Lord
Tom Phillips, Deputy Chief of Naval Staff
Henry Moore, Assistant Chief of Naval Staff (Trade)
Sir Henry Harwood, Assistant Chief of Naval Staff (Foreign)
Arthur Power, Assistant Chief of Naval Staff (Home)
Sir Victor Warrender, Bt, Parliamentary and Financial Secretary to the Admiralty
Austin Uvedale Morgan Hudson, Civil Lord
Sir James Lithgow, Bt, Controller of Merchant Shipbuilding and Repairs
Henry Vaughan Markham, Permanent Secretary to the Admiralty
14 April 1941: Commission
A. V. Alexander, First Lord
Sir Dudley Pound, First Sea Lord
Sir Charles Little, Second Sea Lord
Bruce Fraser, Third Sea Lord
John H. D. Cunningham, Fourth Sea Lord
Arthur Lyster, Fifth Sea Lord
Tom Phillips, Deputy Chief of Naval Staff
Henry Moore, Assistant Chief of Naval Staff (Trade)
Sir Henry Harwood, Assistant Chief of Naval Staff (Foreign)
Arthur Power, Assistant Chief of Naval Staff (Home)
Sir Victor Warrender, Bt, Parliamentary and Financial Secretary to the Admiralty
Austin Uvedale Morgan Hudson, Civil Lord
Sir James Lithgow, Bt, Controller of Merchant Shipbuilding and Repairs
Henry Vaughan Markham, Permanent Secretary to the Admiralty
1 June 1941: Commission
A. V. Alexander, First Lord
Sir Dudley Pound, First Sea Lord
William Whitworth, Second Sea Lord
Bruce Fraser, Third Sea Lord
John H. D. Cunningham, Fourth Sea Lord
Arthur Lyster, Fifth Sea Lord
Tom Phillips, Deputy Chief of Naval Staff
Henry Moore, Assistant Chief of Naval Staff (Trade)
Sir Henry Harwood, Assistant Chief of Naval Staff (Foreign)
Arthur Power, Assistant Chief of Naval Staff (Home)
Sir Victor Warrender, Bt, Parliamentary and Financial Secretary to the Admiralty
Austin Uvedale Morgan Hudson, Civil Lord
Sir James Lithgow, Bt, Controller of Merchant Shipbuilding and Repairs
Henry Vaughan Markham, Permanent Secretary to the Admiralty
22 September 1941: Commission
A. V. Alexander, First Lord
Sir Dudley Pound, First Sea Lord
Sir William Whitworth, Second Sea Lord
Sir Bruce Fraser, Third Sea Lord
Sir John Cunningham, Fourth Sea Lord
Arthur Lyster, Fifth Sea Lord
Sir Tom Phillips, Deputy Chief of Naval Staff
Henry Moore, Assistant Chief of Naval Staff (Trade)
Sir Henry Harwood, Assistant Chief of Naval Staff (Foreign)
Arthur Power, Assistant Chief of Naval Staff (Home)
Rhoderick McGrigor, Assistant Chief of Naval Staff (Weapons)
Sir Victor Warrender, Bt, Parliamentary and Financial Secretary to the Admiralty
Austin Uvedale Morgan Hudson, Civil Lord
Sir James Lithgow, Bt, Controller of Merchant Shipbuilding and Repairs
Sir Henry Vaughan Markham, Permanent Secretary to the Admiralty
21 October 1941: Commission
A. V. Alexander, First Lord
Sir Dudley Pound, First Sea Lord
Sir William Whitworth, Second Sea Lord
Sir Bruce Fraser, Third Sea Lord
Sir John Cunningham, Fourth Sea Lord
Arthur Lyster, Fifth Sea Lord
Sir Tom Phillips, Deputy Chief of Naval Staff
Henry Moore, Assistant Chief of Naval Staff (Trade)
Edward Leigh Stuart King, Assistant Chief of Naval Staff (Trade)
Sir Henry Harwood, Assistant Chief of Naval Staff (Foreign)
Arthur Power, Assistant Chief of Naval Staff (Home)
Rhoderick McGrigor, Assistant Chief of Naval Staff (Weapons)
Sir Victor Warrender, Bt, Parliamentary and Financial Secretary to the Admiralty
Austin Uvedale Morgan Hudson, Civil Lord
Sir James Lithgow, Bt, Controller of Merchant Shipbuilding and Repairs
Sir Henry Vaughan Markham, Permanent Secretary to the Admiralty

1941 to 1964
9 February 1942: Commission
A. V. Alexander, First Lord
Sir Dudley Pound, First Sea Lord
Sir William Whitworth, Second Sea Lord
Sir Bruce Fraser, Third Sea Lord
Sir John Cunningham, Fourth Sea Lord
Arthur Lyster, Fifth Sea Lord
Henry Moore, Vice Chief of Naval Staff
Edward Leigh Stuart King, Assistant Chief of Naval Staff (Trade)
Sir Henry Harwood, Assistant Chief of Naval Staff (Foreign)
Arthur Power, Assistant Chief of Naval Staff (Home)
Rhoderick McGrigor, Assistant Chief of Naval Staff (Weapons)
George Henry Hall, Civil Lord
Sir Victor Warrender, Bt, Parliamentary and Financial Secretary to the Admiralty
Austin Uvedale Morgan Hudson, Civil Lord
Sir James Lithgow, Bt, Controller of Merchant Shipbuilding and Repairs
Sir Henry Vaughan Markham, Permanent Secretary to the Admiralty
5 March 1942: Commission
A. V. Alexander, First Lord
Sir Dudley Pound, First Sea Lord
Sir William Whitworth, Second Sea Lord
Sir Bruce Fraser, Third Sea Lord
Sir John Cunningham, Fourth Sea Lord
Arthur Lyster, Fifth Sea Lord
Henry Moore, Vice Chief of Naval Staff
Edward Leigh Stuart King, Assistant Chief of Naval Staff (Trade)
Sir Henry Harwood, Assistant Chief of Naval Staff (Foreign)
Arthur Power, Assistant Chief of Naval Staff (Home)
Rhoderick McGrigor, Assistant Chief of Naval Staff (Weapons)
George Henry Hall, Civil Lord
Sir Victor Warrender, Bt, Parliamentary and Financial Secretary to the Admiralty
Richard Pilkington, Civil Lord
Sir James Lithgow, Bt, Controller of Merchant Shipbuilding and Repairs
Sir Henry Vaughan Markham, Permanent Secretary to the Admiralty
8 April 1942: Commission
A. V. Alexander, First Lord
Sir Dudley Pound, First Sea Lord
Sir William Whitworth, Second Sea Lord
Sir Bruce Fraser, Third Sea Lord
Sir John Cunningham, Fourth Sea Lord
Arthur Lyster, Fifth Sea Lord
Henry Moore, Vice Chief of Naval Staff
Edward Leigh Stuart King, Assistant Chief of Naval Staff (Trade)
Arthur Power, Assistant Chief of Naval Staff (Home)
Rhoderick McGrigor, Assistant Chief of Naval Staff (Weapons)
George Henry Hall, Civil Lord
The Lord Bruntisfield, Parliamentary and Financial Secretary to the Admiralty
Richard Pilkington, Civil Lord
Sir James Lithgow, Bt, Controller of Merchant Shipbuilding and Repairs
Sir Henry Vaughan Markham, Permanent Secretary to the Admiralty
22 May 1942: Commission
A. V. Alexander, First Lord
Sir Dudley Pound, First Sea Lord
Sir William Whitworth, Second Sea Lord
Sir Frederic Wake-Walker, Third Sea Lord
Sir John Cunningham, Fourth Sea Lord
Arthur Lyster, Fifth Sea Lord
Henry Moore, Vice Chief of Naval Staff
Edward Leigh Stuart King, Assistant Chief of Naval Staff (Trade)
Arthur Power, Assistant Chief of Naval Staff (Home)
Rhoderick McGrigor, Assistant Chief of Naval Staff (Weapons)
George Henry Hall, Civil Lord
The Lord Bruntisfield, Parliamentary and Financial Secretary to the Admiralty
Richard Pilkington, Civil Lord
Sir James Lithgow, Bt, Controller of Merchant Shipbuilding and Repairs
Sir Henry Vaughan Markham, Permanent Secretary to the Admiralty
28 May 1942: Commission
A. V. Alexander, First Lord
Sir Dudley Pound, First Sea Lord
Sir William Whitworth, Second Sea Lord
Sir Frederic Wake-Walker, Third Sea Lord
Sir John Cunningham, Fourth Sea Lord
Arthur Lyster, Fifth Sea Lord
Henry Moore, Vice Chief of Naval Staff
Edward Leigh Stuart King, Assistant Chief of Naval Staff (Trade)
Rhoderick McGrigor, Assistant Chief of Naval Staff (Weapons)
George Henry Hall, Civil Lord
The Lord Bruntisfield, Parliamentary and Financial Secretary to the Admiralty
Richard Pilkington, Civil Lord
Sir James Lithgow, Bt, Controller of Merchant Shipbuilding and Repairs
Sir Henry Vaughan Markham, Permanent Secretary to the Admiralty
7 December 1942: Commission
A. V. Alexander, First Lord
Sir Dudley Pound, First Sea Lord
Sir Charles Kennedy-Purvis, Deputy First Sea Lord
Sir William Whitworth, Second Sea Lord
Sir Frederic Wake-Walker, Third Sea Lord
Sir John Cunningham, Fourth Sea Lord
Sir Henry Moore, Vice Chief of Naval Staff
John Edelsten, Assistant Chief of Naval Staff (U-Boat Warfare and Trade)
Rhoderick McGrigor, Assistant Chief of Naval Staff (Weapons)
George Henry Hall, Civil Lord
The Lord Bruntisfield, Parliamentary and Financial Secretary to the Admiralty
Richard Pilkington, Civil Lord
Sir James Lithgow, Bt, Controller of Merchant Shipbuilding and Repairs
Henry Vaughan Markham, Permanent Secretary to the Admiralty
14 January 1943: Commission
A. V. Alexander, First Lord
Sir Dudley Pound, First Sea Lord
Sir Charles Kennedy-Purvis, Deputy First Sea Lord
Sir William Whitworth, Second Sea Lord
Sir Frederic Wake-Walker, Third Sea Lord
Sir John Cunningham, Fourth Sea Lord
Denis Boyd, Fifth Sea Lord
Sir Henry Moore, Vice Chief of Naval Staff
John Edelsten, Assistant Chief of Naval Staff (U-Boat Warfare and Trade)
Rhoderick McGrigor, Assistant Chief of Naval Staff (Weapons)
George Henry Hall, Civil Lord
The Lord Bruntisfield, Parliamentary and Financial Secretary to the Admiralty
Richard Pilkington, Civil Lord
Sir James Lithgow, Bt, Controller of Merchant Shipbuilding and Repairs
Sir Henry Vaughan Markham, Permanent Secretary to the Admiralty
8 March 1943: Commission
A. V. Alexander, First Lord
Sir Dudley Pound, First Sea Lord
Sir Charles Kennedy-Purvis, Deputy First Sea Lord
Sir William Whitworth, Second Sea Lord
Sir Frederic Wake-Walker, Third Sea Lord
Sir John Cunningham, Fourth Sea Lord
Denis Boyd, Fifth Sea Lord
Sir Henry Moore, Vice Chief of Naval Staff
John Edelsten, Assistant Chief of Naval Staff (U-Boat Warfare and Trade)
Wilfrid Patterson, Assistant Chief of Naval Staff (Weapons)
George Henry Hall, Civil Lord
The Lord Bruntisfield, Parliamentary and Financial Secretary to the Admiralty
Richard Pilkington, Civil Lord
Sir James Lithgow, Bt, Controller of Merchant Shipbuilding and Repairs
Sir Henry Vaughan Markham, Permanent Secretary to the Admiralty
8 May 1943: Commission
A. V. Alexander, First Lord
Sir Dudley Pound, First Sea Lord
Sir Charles Kennedy-Purvis, Deputy First Sea Lord
Sir William Whitworth, Second Sea Lord
Sir Frederic Wake-Walker, Third Sea Lord
Frank Pegram, Fourth Sea Lord
Denis Boyd, Fifth Sea Lord
Sir Henry Moore, Vice Chief of Naval Staff
John Edelsten, Assistant Chief of Naval Staff (U-Boat Warfare and Trade)
Wilfrid Patterson, Assistant Chief of Naval Staff (Weapons)
George Henry Hall, Civil Lord
The Lord Bruntisfield, Parliamentary and Financial Secretary to the Admiralty
Richard Pilkington, Civil Lord
Sir James Lithgow, Bt, Controller of Merchant Shipbuilding and Repairs
Sir Henry Vaughan Markham, Permanent Secretary to the Admiralty
7 June 1943: Commission
A. V. Alexander, First Lord
Sir Dudley Pound, First Sea Lord
Sir Charles Kennedy-Purvis, Deputy First Sea Lord
Sir William Whitworth, Second Sea Lord
Sir Frederic Wake-Walker, Third Sea Lord
Frank Pegram, Fourth Sea Lord
Denis Boyd, Fifth Sea Lord
Sir Edward Syfret, Vice Chief of Naval Staff
John Edelsten, Assistant Chief of Naval Staff (U-Boat Warfare and Trade)
Wilfrid Patterson, Assistant Chief of Naval Staff (Weapons)
George Henry Hall, Civil Lord
The Lord Bruntisfield, Parliamentary and Financial Secretary to the Admiralty
Richard Pilkington, Civil Lord
Sir James Lithgow, Bt, Controller of Merchant Shipbuilding and Repairs
Sir Henry Vaughan Markham, Permanent Secretary of the Admiralty
28 September 1943: Commission
A. V. Alexander, First Lord
Sir Dudley Pound, First Sea Lord
Sir Charles Kennedy-Purvis, Deputy First Sea Lord
Sir William Whitworth, Second Sea Lord
Sir Frederic Wake-Walker, Third Sea Lord
Frank Pegram, Fourth Sea Lord
Denis Boyd, Fifth Sea Lord
Sir Edward Syfret, Vice Chief of Naval Staff
John Edelsten, Assistant Chief of Naval Staff (U-Boat Warfare and Trade)
Wilfrid Patterson, Assistant Chief of Naval Staff (Weapons)
The Lord Bruntisfield, Parliamentary and Financial Secretary to the Admiralty
Richard Pilkington, Civil Lord
James Thomas, Civil Lord
Sir James Lithgow, Bt, Controller of Merchant Shipbuilding and Repairs
Sir Henry Vaughan Markham, Permanent Secretary of the Admiralty
15 October 1943: Commission
A. V. Alexander, First Lord
Sir Andrew Cunningham, Bt, First Sea Lord
Sir Charles Kennedy-Purvis, Deputy First Sea Lord
Sir William Whitworth, Second Sea Lord
Sir Frederic Wake-Walker, Third Sea Lord
Frank Pegram, Fourth Sea Lord
Denis Boyd, Fifth Sea Lord
Sir Edward Syfret, Vice Chief of Naval Staff
John Edelsten, Assistant Chief of Naval Staff (U-Boat Warfare and Trade)
Wilfrid Patterson, Assistant Chief of Naval Staff (Weapons)
The Lord Bruntisfield, Parliamentary and Financial Secretary to the Admiralty
Richard Pilkington, Civil Lord
James Thomas, Civil Lord
Sir James Lithgow, Bt, Controller of Merchant Shipbuilding and Repairs
Sir Henry Vaughan Markham, Permanent Secretary of the Admiralty
8 March 1944: Commission
A. V. Alexander, First Lord
Sir Andrew Cunningham, Bt, First Sea Lord
Sir Charles Kennedy-Purvis, Deputy First Sea Lord
Sir Algernon Willis, Second Sea Lord
Sir Frederic Wake-Walker, Third Sea Lord
Frank Pegram, Fourth Sea Lord
Denis Boyd, Fifth Sea Lord
Sir Edward Syfret, Vice Chief of Naval Staff
John Edelsten, Assistant Chief of Naval Staff (U-Boat Warfare and Trade)
Wilfrid Patterson, Assistant Chief of Naval Staff (Weapons)
The Lord Bruntisfield, Parliamentary and Financial Secretary to the Admiralty
Richard Pilkington, Civil Lord
James Thomas, Civil Lord
Sir James Lithgow, Bt, Controller of Merchant Shipbuilding and Repairs
Sir Henry Vaughan Markham, Permanent Secretary of the Admiralty
20 March 1944: Commission
A. V. Alexander, First Lord
Sir Andrew Cunningham, Bt, First Sea Lord
Sir Charles Kennedy-Purvis, Deputy First Sea Lord
Sir Algernon Willis, Second Sea Lord
Sir Frederic Wake-Walker, Third Sea Lord
Arthur Palliser, Fourth Sea Lord
Denis Boyd, Fifth Sea Lord
Sir Edward Syfret, Vice Chief of Naval Staff
John Edelsten, Assistant Chief of Naval Staff (U-Boat Warfare and Trade)
Wilfrid Patterson, Assistant Chief of Naval Staff (Weapons)
The Lord Bruntisfield, Parliamentary and Financial Secretary to the Admiralty
Richard Pilkington, Civil Lord
James Thomas, Civil Lord
Sir James Lithgow, Bt, Controller of Merchant Shipbuilding and Repairs
Sir Henry Vaughan Markham, Permanent Secretary of the Admiralty
11 December 1944: Commission
A. V. Alexander, First Lord
Sir Andrew Cunningham, Bt, First Sea Lord
Sir Charles Kennedy-Purvis, Deputy First Sea Lord
Sir Algernon Willis, Second Sea Lord
Sir Frederic Wake-Walker, Third Sea Lord
Arthur Palliser, Fourth Sea Lord
Denis Boyd, Fifth Sea Lord
Sir Edward Syfret, Vice Chief of Naval Staff
Wilfrid Patterson, Assistant Chief of Naval Staff (Weapons)
The Lord Bruntisfield, Parliamentary and Financial Secretary to the Admiralty
Richard Pilkington, Civil Lord
James Thomas, Civil Lord
Sir James Lithgow, Bt, Controller of Merchant Shipbuilding and Repairs
Sir Henry Vaughan Markham, Permanent Secretary of the Admiralty
3 March 1945: Commission
A. V. Alexander, First Lord
Sir Andrew Cunningham, Bt, First Sea Lord
Sir Charles Kennedy-Purvis, Deputy First Sea Lord
Sir Algernon Willis, Second Sea Lord
Sir Frederic Wake-Walker, Third Sea Lord
Sir Arthur Palliser, Fourth Sea Lord
Denis Boyd, Fifth Sea Lord
Sir Edward Syfret, Vice Chief of Naval Staff
The Lord Bruntisfield, Parliamentary and Financial Secretary to the Admiralty
Richard Pilkington, Civil Lord
James Thomas, Civil Lord
Sir James Lithgow, Bt, Controller of Merchant Shipbuilding and Repairs
Sir Henry Vaughan Markham, Permanent Secretary of the Admiralty
1 May 1945: Commission
A. V. Alexander, First Lord
Sir Andrew Cunningham, Bt, First Sea Lord
Sir Charles Kennedy-Purvis, Deputy First Sea Lord
Sir Algernon Willis, Second Sea Lord
Sir Frederic Wake-Walker, Third Sea Lord
Sir Arthur Palliser, Fourth Sea Lord
Thomas Hope Troubridge, Fifth Sea Lord
Sir Edward Syfret, Vice Chief of Naval Staff
The Lord Bruntisfield, Parliamentary and Financial Secretary to the Admiralty
Richard Pilkington, Civil Lord
James Thomas, Civil Lord
Sir James Lithgow, Bt, Controller of Merchant Shipbuilding and Repairs
Sir Henry Vaughan Markham, Permanent Secretary to the Admiralty
29 May 1945: Commission
Brendan Bracken, First Lord
Sir Andrew Cunningham, Bt, First Sea Lord
Sir Charles Kennedy-Purvis, Deputy First Sea Lord
Sir Algernon Willis, Second Sea Lord
Sir Frederic Wake-Walker, Third Sea Lord
Sir Arthur Palliser, Fourth Sea Lord
Thomas Hope Troubridge, Fifth Sea Lord
Sir Edward Syfret, Vice Chief of Naval Staff
The Lord Bruntisfield, Parliamentary and Financial Secretary to the Admiralty
Richard Pilkington, Civil Lord
James Thomas, Civil Lord
Sir James Lithgow, Bt, Controller of Merchant Shipbuilding and Repairs
Sir Henry Vaughan Markham, Permanent Secretary of the Admiralty
4 August 1945: Commission
A. V. Alexander, First Lord
Sir Andrew Cunningham, Bt, First Sea Lord
Sir Charles Kennedy-Purvis, Deputy First Sea Lord
Sir Algernon Willis, Second Sea Lord
Sir Frederic Wake-Walker, Third Sea Lord
Sir Arthur Palliser, Fourth Sea Lord
Thomas Hope Troubridge, Fifth Sea Lord
Sir Edward Syfret, Vice Chief of Naval Staff
John Dugdale, Parliamentary and Financial Secretary to the Admiralty
Walter Edwards, Civil Lord
Sir James Lithgow, Bt, Controller of Merchant Shipbuilding and Repairs
Sir Henry Vaughan Markham, Permanent Secretary of the Admiralty
5 October 1945: Commission
A. V. Alexander, First Lord
The Lord Cunningham of Hyndhope, First Sea Lord
Sir Charles Kennedy-Purvis, Deputy First Sea Lord
Sir Algernon Willis, Second Sea Lord
Sir Frederic Wake-Walker, Third Sea Lord
Sir Arthur Palliser, Fourth Sea Lord
Thomas Hope Troubridge, Fifth Sea Lord
Sir Rhoderick McGrigor, Vice Chief of Naval Staff
John Dugdale, Parliamentary and Financial Secretary to the Admiralty
Walter Edwards, Civil Lord
Sir James Lithgow, Bt, Controller of Merchant Shipbuilding and Repairs
Sir Henry Vaughan Markham, Permanent Secretary of the Admiralty
4 December 1945: Commission
A. V. Alexander, First Lord
The Lord Cunningham of Hyndhope, First Sea Lord
Sir Charles Kennedy-Purvis, Deputy First Sea Lord
Sir Algernon Willis, Second Sea Lord
Charles Saumarez Daniel, Third Sea Lord
Sir Arthur Palliser, Fourth Sea Lord
Thomas Hope Troubridge, Fifth Sea Lord
Sir Rhoderick McGrigor, Vice Chief of Naval Staff
John Dugdale, Parliamentary and Financial Secretary to the Admiralty
Walter Edwards, Civil Lord
Sir James Lithgow, Bt, Controller of Merchant Shipbuilding and Repairs
Sir Henry Vaughan Markham, Permanent Secretary of the Admiralty
21 January 1946: Commission
A. V. Alexander, First Lord
The Lord Cunningham of Hyndhope, First Sea Lord
Sir Charles Kennedy-Purvis, Deputy First Sea Lord
Sir Algernon Willis, Second Sea Lord
Charles Saumarez Daniel, Third Sea Lord
Douglas Fisher, Fourth Sea Lord
Sir Thomas Troubridge, Fifth Sea Lord
Sir Rhoderick McGrigor, Vice Chief of Naval Staff
John Dugdale, Parliamentary and Financial Secretary to the Admiralty
Walter Edwards, Civil Lord
Sir James Lithgow, Bt, Controller of Merchant Shipbuilding and Repai rs
Sir Henry Vaughan Markham, Permanent Secretary of the Admiralty
1 February 1946: Commission
A. V. Alexander, First Lord
The Viscount Cunningham of Hyndhope, First Sea Lord
Sir Charles Kennedy-Purvis, Deputy First Sea Lord
Sir Algernon Willis, Second Sea Lord
Charles Saumarez Daniel, Third Sea Lord
Sir Douglas Fisher, Fourth Sea Lord
Sir Thomas Troubridge, Fifth Sea Lord
Sir Rhoderick McGrigor, Vice Chief of Naval Staff
John Dugdale, Parliamentary and Financial Secretary to the Admiralty
Walter Edwards, Civil Lord
Sir Henry Vaughan Markham, Permanent Secretary of the Admiralty
27 February 1946: Commission
A. V. Alexander, First Lord
The Viscount Cunningham of Hyndhope, First Sea Lord
Sir Charles Kennedy-Purvis, Deputy First Sea Lord
Sir Arthur Power, Second Sea Lord
Charles Saumarez Daniel, Third Sea Lord
Sir Douglas Fisher, Fourth Sea Lord
Sir Thomas Troubridge, Fifth Sea Lord
Sir Rhoderick McGrigor, Vice Chief of Naval Staff
John Dugdale, Parliamentary and Financial Secretary to the Admiralty
Walter Edwards, Civil Lord
Sir Henry Vaughan Markham, Permanent Secretary of the Admiralty
15 April 1946: Commission
A. V. Alexander, First Lord
The Viscount Cunningham of Hyndhope, First Sea Lord
Sir Arthur Power, Second Sea Lord
Charles Saumarez Daniel, Third Sea Lord
Sir Douglas Fisher, Fourth Sea Lord
Sir Thomas Troubridge, Fifth Sea Lord
Sir Rhoderick McGrigor, Vice Chief of Naval Staff
Robert Oliver, Deputy Chief of Naval Staff
John Dugdale, Parliamentary and Financial Secretary to the Admiralty
Walter Edwards, Civil Lord
Sir Henry Vaughan Markham, Permanent Secretary of the Admiralty
10 June 1946: Commission
A. V. Alexander, First Lord
Sir John Cunningham, First Sea Lord
Sir Arthur Power, Second Sea Lord
Charles Saumarez Daniel, Third Sea Lord
Sir Douglas Fisher, Fourth Sea Lord
Sir Thomas Troubridge, Fifth Sea Lord
Sir Rhoderick McGrigor, Vice Chief of Naval Staff
Robert Oliver, Deputy Chief of Naval Staff
John Dugdale, Parliamentary and Financial Secretary to the Admiralty
Walter Edwards, Civil Lord
Sir Henry Vaughan Markham, Permanent Secretary of the Admiralty
23 September 1946: Commission
A. V. Alexander, First Lord
Sir John Cunningham, First Sea Lord
Sir Arthur Power, Second Sea Lord
Charles Saumarez Daniel, Third Sea Lord
Sir Douglas Fisher, Fourth Sea Lord
Sir Philip Vian, Fifth Sea Lord
Sir Rhoderick McGrigor, Vice Chief of Naval Staff
Robert Oliver, Deputy Chief of Naval Staff
John Dugdale, Parliamentary and Financial Secretary to the Admiralty
Walter Edwards, Civil Lord
Sir Henry Vaughan Markham, Permanent Secretary of the Admiralty
7 October 1946: Commission
George Henry Hall, First Lord
Sir John Cunningham, First Sea Lord
Sir Arthur Power, Second Sea Lord
Charles Saumarez Daniel, Third Sea Lord
Sir Douglas Fisher, Fourth Sea Lord
Sir Philip Vian, Fifth Sea Lord
Sir Rhoderick McGrigor, Vice Chief of Naval Staff
Robert Oliver, Deputy Chief of Naval Staff
John Dugdale, Parliamentary and Financial Secretary to the Admiralty
Walter Edwards, Civil Lord
Sir Henry Vaughan Markham, Permanent Secretary to the Admiralty
8 January 1947: Commission
The Viscount Hall, First Lord
Sir John Cunningham, First Sea Lord
Sir Arthur Power, Second Sea Lord
Charles Saumarez Daniel, Third Sea Lord
Sir Douglas Fisher, Fourth Sea Lord
Sir Philip Vian, Fifth Sea Lord
Sir Rhoderick McGrigor, Vice Chief of Naval Staff
Robert Oliver, Deputy Chief of Naval Staff
John Dugdale, Parliamentary and Financial Secretary to the Admiralty
Walter Edwards, Civil Lord
Sir John Lang, Permanent Secretary of the Admiralty
25 April 1947: Commission
The Viscount Hall, First Lord
Sir John Cunningham, First Sea Lord
Sir Arthur Power, Second Sea Lord
Charles Saumarez Daniel, Third Sea Lord
Sir Douglas Fisher, Fourth Sea Lord
Sir Philip Vian, Fifth Sea Lord
Sir Rhoderick McGrigor, Vice Chief of Naval Staff
Geoffrey Oliver, Assistant Chief of Naval Staff
John Dugdale, Parliamentary and Financial Secretary to the Admiralty
Walter Edwards, Civil Lord
Sir John Lang, Permanent Secretary of the Admiralty
14 October 1947: Commission
The Viscount Hall, First Lord
Sir John Cunningham, First Sea Lord
Sir Arthur Power, Second Sea Lord
Charles Saumarez Daniel, Third Sea Lord
Sir Douglas Fisher, Fourth Sea Lord
Sir Philip Vian, Fifth Sea Lord
Sir John Edelsten, Vice Chief of Naval Staff
Geoffrey Oliver, Assistant Chief of Naval Staff
John Dugdale, Parliamentary and Financial Secretary to the Admiralty
Walter Edwards, Civil Lord
Sir John Lang, Permanent Secretary of the Admiralty
8 March 1948: Commission
The Viscount Hall, First Lord
Sir John Cunningham, First Sea Lord
Sir Cecil Harcourt, Second Sea Lord
Charles Saumarez Daniel, Third Sea Lord
Sir Douglas Fisher, Fourth Sea Lord
Sir Philip Vian, Fifth Sea Lord
Sir John Edelsten, Vice Chief of Naval Staff
Geoffrey Oliver, Assistant Chief of Naval Staff
John Dugdale, Parliamentary and Financial Secretary to the Admiralty
Walter Edwards, Civil Lord
Sir John Lang, Permanent Secretary of the Admiralty
30 March 1948: Commission
The Viscount Hall, First Lord
Sir John Cunningham, First Sea Lord
Sir Cecil Harcourt, Second Sea Lord
Sir Charles Daniel, Third Sea Lord
Herbert Annesley Packer, Fourth Sea Lord
Sir Philip Vian, Fifth Sea Lord
Sir John Edelsten, Vice Chief of Naval Staff
Geoffrey Oliver, Assistant Chief of Naval Staff
John Dugdale, Parliamentary and Financial Secretary to the Admiralty
Walter Edwards, Civil Lord
Sir John Lang, Permanent Secretary of the Admiralty
16 August 1948: Commission
The Viscount Hall, First Lord
Sir John Cunningham, First Sea Lord
Sir Cecil Harcourt, Second Sea Lord
Sir Charles Daniel, Third Sea Lord
Herbert Annesley Packer, Fourth Sea Lord
Sir Philip Vian, Fifth Sea Lord
Sir John Edelsten, Vice Chief of Naval Staff
Ralph Edwards, Assistant Chief of Naval Staff
John Dugdale, Parliamentary and Financial Secretary to the Admiralty
Walter Edwards, Civil Lord
Sir John Lang, Permanent Secretary of the Admiralty
29 September 1948: Commission
The Viscount Hall, First Lord
The Lord Fraser of North Cape, First Sea Lord
Sir Cecil Harcourt, Second Sea Lord
Sir Charles Daniel, Third Sea Lord
Herbert Annesley Packer, Fourth Sea Lord
George Creasy, Fifth Sea Lord
Sir John Edelsten, Vice Chief of Naval Staff
Ralph Edwards, Assistant Chief of Naval Staff
John Dugdale, Parliamentary and Financial Secretary to the Admiralty
Walter Edwards, Civil Lord
Sir John Lang, Permanent Secretary of the Admiralty
4 June 1949: Commission
The Viscount Hall, First Lord
The Lord Fraser of North Cape, First Sea Lord
Sir Cecil Harcourt, Second Sea Lord
Michael Denny, Third Sea Lord
Herbert Annesley Packer, Fourth Sea Lord
Sir George Creasy, Fifth Sea Lord
Sir John Edelsten, Vice Chief of Naval Staff
Ralph Edwards, Assistant Chief of Naval Staff
John Dugdale, Parliamentary and Financial Secretary to the Admiralty
Walter Edwards, Civil Lord
Sir John Lang, Permanent Secretary of the Admiralty
21 October 1949: Commission
The Viscount Hall, First Lord
The Lord Fraser of North Cape, First Sea Lord
Sir Cecil Harcourt, Second Sea Lord
Michael Denny, Third Sea Lord
Herbert Annesley Packer, Fourth Sea Lord
Maurice Mansergh, Fifth Sea Lord
Sir John Edelsten, Vice Chief of Naval Staff
Ralph Edwards, Assistant Chief of Naval Staff
John Dugdale, Parliamentary and Financial Secretary to the Admiralty
Walter Edwards, Civil Lord
Sir John Lang, Permanent Secretary of the Admiralty
30 November 1949: Commission
The Viscount Hall, First Lord
The Lord Fraser of North Cape, First Sea Lord
Sir Cecil Harcourt, Second Sea Lord
Michael Denny, Third Sea Lord
Herbert Annesley Packer, Fourth Sea Lord
Maurice Mansergh, Fifth Sea Lord
Sir George Creasy, Vice Chief of Naval Staff
Ralph Edwards, Assistant Chief of Naval Staff
John Dugdale, Parliamentary and Financial Secretary to the Admiralty
Walter Edwards, Civil Lord
Sir John Lang, Permanent Secretary of the Admiralty
3 March 1950: Commission
The Viscount Hall, First Lord
The Lord Fraser of North Cape, First Sea Lord
Sir Cecil Harcourt, Second Sea Lord
Michael Denny, Third Sea Lord
Herbert Annesley Packer, Fourth Sea Lord
Maurice Mansergh, Fifth Sea Lord
Sir George Creasy, Vice Chief of Naval Staff
Ralph Edwards, Assistant Chief of Naval Staff
James Callaghan, Parliamentary and Financial Secretary to the Admiralty
Walter Edwards, Civil Lord
Sir John Lang, Permanent Secretary of the Admiralty
21 July 1950: Commission
The Viscount Hall, First Lord
The Lord Fraser of North Cape, First Sea Lord
Sir Cecil Harcourt, Second Sea Lord
Sir Michael Denny, Third Sea Lord
The Earl Mountbatten of Burma, Fourth Sea Lord
Maurice Mansergh, Fifth Sea Lord
Sir George Creasy, Vice Chief of Naval Staff
Ralph Edwards, Assistant Chief of Naval Staff
James Callaghan, Parliamentary and Financial Secretary to the Admiralty
Walter Edwards, Civil Lord
Sir John Lang, Permanent ·Secretary of the Admiralty
25 September 1950: Commission
The Viscount Hall, First Lord
The Lord Fraser of North Cape, First Sea Lord
Alexander Madden, Second Sea Lord
Sir Michael Denny, Third Sea Lord
The Earl Mountbatten of Burma, Fourth Sea Lord
Maurice Mansergh, Fifth Sea Lord
Sir George Creasy, Vice Chief of Naval Staff
Ralph Edwards, Assistant Chief of Naval Staff
James Callaghan, Parliamentary and Financial Secretary to the Admiralty
Walter Edwards, Civil Lord
Sir John Lang, Permanent Secretary of the Admiralty
11 December 1950: Commission
The Viscount Hall, First Lord
The Lord Fraser of North Cape, First Sea Lord
Alexander Madden, Second Sea Lord
Sir Michael Denny, Third Sea Lord
The Earl Mountbatten of Burma, Fourth Sea Lord
Maurice Mansergh, Fifth Sea Lord
Sir George Creasy, Vice Chief of Naval Staff
Edward Evans-Lombe, Assistant Chief of Naval Staff
James Callaghan, Parliamentary and Financial Secretary to the Admiralty
Walter Edwards, Civil Lord
Sir John Lang, Permanent Secretary to the Admiralty
30 May 1951: Commission
The Lord Pakenham, First Lord
The Lord Fraser of North Cape, First Sea Lord
Alexander Madden, Second Sea Lord
Sir Michael Denny, Third Sea Lord
The Earl Mountbatten of Burma, Fourth Sea Lord
Maurice Mansergh, Fifth Sea Lord
Sir George Creasy, Vice Chief of Naval Staff
Edward Evans-Lombe, Assistant Chief of Naval Staff
James Callaghan, Parliamentary and Financial Secretary to the Admiralty
Walter Edwards, Civil Lord
Sir John Lang, Permanent Secretary of the Admiralty
4 October 1951: Commission
The Lord Pakenham, First Lord
The Lord Fraser of North Cape, First Sea Lord
Alexander Madden, Second Sea Lord
Sir Michael Denny, Third Sea Lord
The Earl Mountbatten of Burma, Fourth Sea Lord
Edmund Anstice, Fifth Sea Lord
Guy Grantham, Vice Chief of Naval Staff
Edward Evans-Lombe, Assistant Chief of Naval Staff
James Callaghan, Parliamentary and Financial Secretary to the Admiralty
Walter Edwards, Civil Lord
Sir John Lang, Permanent Secretary of the Admiralty
5 November 1951: Commission
James Thomas, First Lord
The Lord Fraser of North Cape, First Sea Lord
Alexander Madden, Second Sea Lord
Sir Michael Denny, Third Sea Lord
The Earl Mountbatten of Burma, Fourth Sea Lord
Edmund Anstice, Fifth Sea Lord
Guy Grantham, Vice Chief of Naval Staff
Edward Evans-Lombe, Assistant Chief of Naval Staff
Allan Noble, Parliamentary and Financial Secretary to the Admiralty
Walter Edwards, Civil Lord
Sir John Lang, Permanent Secretary of the Admiralty
20 December 1951: Commission
James Thomas, First Lord
Sir Rhoderick McGrigor, First Sea Lord
Alexander Madden, Second Sea Lord
Sir Michael Denny, Third Sea Lord
The Earl Mountbatten of Burma, Fourth Sea Lord
Edmund Anstice, Fifth Sea Lord
Guy Grantham, Vice Chief of Naval Staff
Edward Evans-Lombe, Assistant Chief of Naval Staff
Allan Noble, Parliamentary and Financial Secretary to the Admiralty
Simon Wingfield Digby, Civil Loof
Sir John Lang, Permanent Secretary to the Admiralty
8 February 1952: Commission
James Thomas, First Lord
Sir Rhoderick McGrigor, First Sea Lord
Alexander Madden, Second Sea Lord
Sir Michael Denny, Third Sea Lord
Sydney Raw, Fourth Sea Lord
Edmund Anstice, Fifth Sea Lord
Guy Grantham, Vice Chief of Naval Staff
Edward Evans-Lombe, Assistant Chief of Naval Staff
Allan Noble, Parliamentary and Financial Secretary to the Admiralty
Simon Wingfield Digby, Civil Lord
Sir John Lang, Permanent Secretary of the Admiralty
6 January 1953: Commission
James Thomas, First Lord
Sir Rhoderick McGrigor, First Sea Lord
Alexander Madden, Second Sea Lord
Sir Michael Denny, Third Sea Lord
Sydney Raw, Fourth Sea Lord
Edmund Anstice, Fifth Sea Lord
Guy Grantham, Vice Chief of Naval Staff
Geoffrey Barnard, Assistant Chief of Naval Staff
Allan Noble, Parliamentary and Financial Secretary to the Admiralty
Simon Wingfield Digby, Civil Lord
Sir John Lang, Permanent Secretary of the Admiralty
7 April 1953: Commission
James Thomas, First Lord
Sir Rhoderick McGrigor, First Sea Lord
Alexander Madden, Second Sea Lord
Ralph Edwards, Third Sea Lord
Sydney Raw, Fourth Sea Lord
Edmund Anstice, Fifth Sea Lord
Guy Grantham, Vice Chief of Naval Staff
Geoffrey Barnard, Assistant Chief of Naval Staff
Allan Noble, Parliamentary and Financial Secretary to the Admiralty
Simon Wingfield Digby, Civil Lord
Sir John Lang, Permanent Secretary of the Admiralty
1 September 1953: Commission
James Thomas, First Lord
Sir Rhoderick McGrigor, First Sea Lord
Sir Guy Russell, Second Sea Lord
Ralph Edwards, Third Sea Lord
Sydney Raw, Fourth Sea Lord
Sir Edmund Anstice, Fifth Sea Lord
Guy Grantham, Vice Chief of Naval Staff
Geoffrey Barnard, Assistant Chief of Naval Staff
Allan Noble, Parliamentary and Financial Secretary of the Admiralty
Simon Wingfield Digby, Civil Lord
Sir John Lang, Permanent Secretary to the Admiralty
5 April 1954: Commission
James Thomas, First Lord
Sir Rhoderick McGrigor, First Sea Lord
Sir Guy Russell, Second Sea Lord
Ralph Edwards, Third Sea Lord
Frederick Parham, Fourth Sea Lord
Sir Edmund Anstice, Fifth Sea Lord
Guy Grantham, Vice Chief of Naval Staff
Geoffrey Barnard, Assistant Chief of Naval Staff
Allan Noble, Parliamentary and Financial Secretary to the Admiralty
Simon Wingfield Digby, Civil Lord
Sir John Lang, Permanent Secretary of the Admiralty
12 April 1954: Commission
James Thomas, First Lord
Sir Rhoderick McGrigor, First Sea Lord
Sir Guy Russell, Second Sea Lord
Ralph Edwards, Third Sea Lord
Frederick Parham, Fourth Sea Lord
Sir Edmund Anstice, Fifth Sea Lord
William Wellclose Davis, Vice Chief of Naval Staff
Geoffrey Barnard, Assistant Chief of Naval Staff
Allan Noble, Parliamentary and Financial Secretary to the Admiralty
Simon Wingfield Digby, Civil Lord
Sir John Lang, Permanent Secretary of the Admiralty
18 April 1955: Commission
James Thomas, First Lord
The Earl Mountbatten of Burma, First Sea Lord
Sir Guy Russell, Second Sea Lord
Ralph Edwards, Third Sea Lord
Frederick Parham, Fourth Sea Lord
Alexander Bingley, Fifth Sea Lord
William Wellclose Davis, Vice Chief of Naval Staff
Eric Clifford, Assistant Chief of Naval Staff
Allan Noble, Parliamentary and Financial Secretary to the Admiralty
Simon Wingfield Digby, Civil Lord
Sir John Lang, Permanent Secretary of the Admiralty
12 September 1955: Commission
James Thomas, First Lord
The Earl Mountbatten of Burma, First Sea Lord
Sir Guy Russell, Second Sea Lord
Ralph Edwards, Third Sea Lord
Robert Dymock Watson, Fourth Sea Lord
Alexander Bingley, Fifth Sea Lord
William Wellclose Davis, Vice Chief of Naval Staff
Eric Clifford, Assistant Chief of Naval Staff
Allan Noble, Parliamentary and Financial Secretary to the Admiralty
Simon Wingfield Digby, Civil Lord
Sir John Lang, Permanent Secretary of the Admiralty
22 December 1955: Commission
James Thomas, First Lord
The Earl Mountbatten of Burma, First Sea Lord
Sir Charles Lambe, Second Sea Lord
Ralph Edwards, Third Sea Lord
Robert Dymock Watson, Fourth Sea Lord
Alexander Bingley, Fifth Sea Lord
William Wellclose Davis, Vice Chief of Naval Staff
Eric Clifford, Assistant Chief of Naval Staff
George Ward, Parliamentary and Financial Secretary to the Admiralty
Simon Wingfield Digby, Civil Lord
Sir John Lang, Permanent Secretary of the Admiralty
19 October 1956: Commission
The Viscount Hailsham, First Lord
The Earl Mountbatten of Burma, First Sea Lord
Sir Charles Lambe, Second Sea Lord
John Peter Lorne Reid, Third Sea Lord
Robert Dymock Watson, Fourth Sea Lord
Alexander Bingley, Fifth Sea Lord
Sir William Wellclose Davis, Vice Chief of Naval Staff
Sir Eric Clifford, Assistant Chief of Naval Staff
George Ward, Parliamentary and Financial Secretary to the Admiralty
Simon Wingfield Digby, Civil Lord
Sir John Lang, Permanent Secretary of the Admiralty
14 October 1957: Commission
The Earl of Selkirk, First Lord
The Earl Mountbatten of Burma, First Sea Lord
Deric Holland-Martin, Second Sea Lord
Sir John Peter Lorne Reid, Third Sea Lord
Robert Dymock Watson, Fourth Sea Lord
Sir Caspar John, Vice Chief of Naval Staff
Alexander Bingley, Assistant Chief of Naval Staff
Christopher Soames, Parliamentary and Financial Secretary to the Admiralty
Tam Galbraith, Civil Lord
Sir John Lang, Permanent Secretary of the Admiralty
17 January 1958: Commission
The Earl of Selkirk, First Lord
The Earl Mountbatten of Burma, First Sea Lord
Deric Holland-Martin, Second Sea Lord
Sir John Peter Lorne Reid, Third Sea Lord
Sir Gordon Hubback, Fourth Sea Lord
Sir Caspar John, Vice Chief of Naval Staff
Manley Laurence Power, Assistant Chief of Naval Staff
Robert Allan, Parliamentary and Financial Secretary to the Admiralty
Tam Galbraith, Civil Lord
Sir John Lang, Permanent Secretary of the Admiralty
20 January 1959: Commission
The Earl of Selkirk, First Lord
The Earl Mountbatten of Burma, First Sea Lord
Deric Holland-Martin, Second Sea Lord
Sir John Peter Lorne Reid, Third Sea Lord
Nicholas Copeman, Fourth Sea Lord
Sir Caspar John, Vice Chief of Naval Staff
Sir Manley Power, Assistant Chief of Naval Staff
Ian Orr-Ewing, Parliamentary and Financial Secretary of the Admiralty
Tam Galbraith, Civil Lord
Sir John Lang, Permanent Secretary to the Admiralty
17 February 1959: Commission
The Earl of Selkirk, First Lord
The Earl Mountbatten of Burma, First Sea Lord
Deric Holland-Martin, Second Sea Lord
Sir John Peter Lorne Reid, Third Sea Lord
Nicholas Copeman, Fourth Sea Lord
Sir Caspar John, Vice Chief of Naval Staff
Laurence Durlacher, Assistant Chief of Naval Staff
Ian Orr-Ewing, Parliamentary and Financial Secretary of the Admiralty
Tam Galbraith, Civil Lord
Sir John Lang, Permanent Secretary of the Admiralty
19 October 1959: Commission
The Lord Carrington, First Lord
Sir Charles Lambe, First Sea Lord
Deric Holland-Martin, Second Sea Lord
Sir John Peter Lorne Reid, Third Sea Lord
Nicholas Copeman, Fourth Sea Lord
Sir Caspar John, Vice Chief of Naval Staff
Laurence Durlacher, Assistant Chief of Naval Staff
Ian Orr-Ewing, Civil Lord
Sir John Lang, Permanent Secretary of the Admiralty
9 December 1959: Commission
The Lord Carrington, First Lord
Sir Charles Lambe, First Sea Lord
Sir St John Tyrwhitt, Bt, Second Sea Lord
Sir John Peter Lorne Reid, Third Sea Lord
Nicholas Copeman, Fourth Sea Lord
Sir Caspar John, Vice Chief of Naval Staff
Laurence Durlacher, Assistant Chief of Naval Staff
Ian Orr-Ewing, Civil Lord
Sir John Lang, Permanent Secretary of the Admiralty
23 May 1960: Commission
The Lord Carrington, First Lord
Sir Caspar John, First Sea Lord
Sir St John Tyrwhitt, Bt, Second Sea Lord
Sir John Peter Lorne Reid, Third Sea Lord
Nicholas Copeman, Fourth Sea Lord
Sir Walter Couchman, Vice Chief of Naval Staff
Laurence Durlacher, Assistant Chief of Naval Staff
Ian Orr-Ewing, Civil Lord
Sir John Lang, Permanent Secretary of the Admiralty
10 January 1961: Commission
The Lord Carrington, First Lord
Sir Caspar John, First Sea Lord
Sir St John Tyrwhitt, Bt, Second Sea Lord
Sir John Peter Lorne Reid, Third Sea Lord
John Michael Villiers, Fourth Sea Lord
Varyl Begg, Vice Chief of Naval Staff
Laurence Durlacher, Assistant Chief of Naval Staff
Ian Orr-Ewing, Civil Lord
Sir John Lang, Permanent Secretary of the Admiralty
1 April 1961: Commission
The Lord Carrington, First Lord
Sir Caspar John, First Sea Lord
Sir St John Tyrwhitt, Bt, Second Sea Lord
Sir John Peter Lorne Reid, Third Sea Lord
John Michael Villiers, Fourth Sea Lord
Varyl Begg, Vice Chief of Naval Staff
Laurence Durlacher, Assistant Chief of Naval Staff
Ian Orr-Ewing, Civil Lord
Sir Clifford Jarrett, Permanent Secretary of the Admiralty
28 September 1961: Commission
The Lord Carrington, First Lord
Sir Caspar John, First Sea Lord
Sir Royston Wright, Second Sea Lord
Sir John Peter Lorne Reid, Third Sea Lord
John Michael Villiers, Fourth Sea Lord
Varyl Begg, Vice Chief of Naval Staff
Laurence Durlacher, Assistant Chief of Naval Staff
Ian Orr-Ewing, Civil Lord
Sir Clifford Jarrett, Permanent Secretary of the Admiralty
1 November 1961: Commission
The Lord Carrington, First Lord
Sir Caspar John, First Sea Lord
Sir Royston Wright, Second Sea Lord
Michael Le Fanu, Third Sea Lord
John Michael Villiers, Fourth Sea Lord
Varyl Begg, Vice Chief of Naval Staff
Laurence Durlacher, Assistant Chief of Naval Staff
Ian Orr-Ewing, Civil Lord
Sir Clifford Jarrett, Permanent Secretary of the Admiralty
3 January 1962: Commission
The Lord Carrington, First Lord
Sir Caspar John, First Sea Lord
Sir Royston Wright, Second Sea Lord
Michael Le Fanu, Third Sea Lord
John Michael Villiers, Fourth Sea Lord
Varyl Begg, Vice Chief of Naval Staff
Peter Gretton, Assistant Chief of Naval Staff
Ian Orr-Ewing, Civil Lord
Sir Clifford Jarrett, Permanent Secretary of the Admiralty
30 January 1963: Commission
The Lord Carrington, First Lord
Sir Caspar John, First Sea Lord
Sir Royston Wright, Second Sea Lord
Michael Le Fanu, Third Sea Lord
Sir John Michael Villiers, Fourth Sea Lord
Sir Varyl Begg, Vice Chief of Naval Staff
Frank Hopkins, Assistant Chief of Naval Staff
Ian Orr-Ewing, Civil Lord
Sir Clifford Jarrett, Permanent Secretary of the Admiralty
15 February 1963: Commission
The Lord Carrington, First Lord
Sir Caspar John, First Sea Lord
Sir Royston Wright, Second Sea Lord
Michael Le Fanu, Third Sea Lord
Sir John Michael Villiers, Fourth Sea Lord
John Frewen, Vice Chief of Naval Staff
Frank Hopkins, Assistant Chief of Naval Staff
Ian Orr-Ewing, Civil Lord
Sir Clifford Jarrett, Permanent Secretary of the Admiralty
10 May 1963: Commission
The Lord Carrington, First Lord
Sir Caspar John, First Sea Lord
Sir Royston Wright, Second Sea Lord
Michael Le Fanu, Third Sea Lord
Sir John Michael Villiers, Fourth Sea Lord
John Frewen, Vice Chief of Naval Staff
Frank Hopkins, Assistant Chief of Naval Staff
John Albert Hay, Civil Lord
Sir Clifford Jarrett, Permanent Secretary of the Admiralty
7 August 1963: Commission
The Lord Carrington, First Lord
Sir David Luce, First Sea Lord
Sir Royston Wright, Second Sea Lord
Michael Le Fanu, Third Sea Lord
Sir John Michael Villiers, Fourth Sea Lord
John Frewen, Vice Chief of Naval Staff
Frank Hopkins, Assistant Chief of Naval Staff
John Albert Hay, Civil Lord
Sir Clifford Jarrett, Permanent Secretary of the Admiralty
21 October 1963: Commission
The Earl Jellicoe, First Lord
Sir David Luce, First Sea Lord
Sir Royston Wright, Second Sea Lord
Michael Le Fanu, Third Sea Lord
Sir John Michael Villiers, Fourth Sea Lord
John Frewen, Vice Chief of Naval Staff
Frank Hopkins, Assistant Chief of Naval Staff
John Albert Hay, Civil Lord
Sir Clifford Jarrett, Permanent Secretary of the Admiralty
17 February 1964: Commission
The Earl Jellicoe, First Lord
Sir David Luce, First Sea Lord
Sir Royston Wright, Second Sea Lord
Michael Le Fanu, Third Sea Lord
Raymond Hawkins, Fourth Sea Lord
John Frewen, Vice Chief of Naval Staff
Frank Hopkins, Assistant Chief of Naval Staff
John Albert Hay, Civil Lord
Arthur Lucius Michael Cary, Permanent Secretary of the Admiralty
1 April 1964: Her Majesty Queen Elizabeth II, Lord High Admiral ( Board of Admiralty abolished)

21st Century
10 June 2011: His Royal Highness The Prince Philip, Duke of Edinburgh, Lord High Admiral (given title on his 90th Birthday).

References

Sources
.

The  London Gazette 

 
Admiralty, List of Lords Commissioners of the
Lord Commissiones

es:Primer Lord del Almirantazgo
sv:Amiralitetslord